This list of the Cenozoic life of Florida contains the various prehistoric life-forms whose fossilized remains have been reported from within the US state of Florida during the Cenozoic Era, between 66 million and 10,000 years ago.

A

 †Abderospira
 †Abderospira funiakensis – type locality for species
 †Abelmoschomys
 †Abelmoschomys simpsoni – type locality for species
 Abertella
  †Abra
 †Abra aequalis
 †Abra cylicion – type locality for species
 †Abra lapochi – type locality for species
 †Abra subreflexa
  Acanthocardia
 †Acanthocardia acrocome
 †Acanthocardia claibornense – or unidentified comparable form
 †Acanthocardia ctenolium
 †Acanthocardia propeciliare
 †Acanthocardia spinosifrons – type locality for species
 Acanthochitona
 †Acanthochitona pygmaea
 †Acantholabia
 †Acantholabia floridana
 †Acantholabia sarasotaensis
 Acar
 †Acar domingensis
 †Acar retciulata
 Accipiter
 †Accipiter cooperii
  †Accipiter striatus
 Acer
 †Acer rubrum
 †Acheronictis
 †Acheronictis webbi – type locality for species
 †Acmaturris
 †Acmaturris metria
 Acorylus
 †Acorylus gouldii
 Acris
 †Acris gryllus – or unidentified comparable form
  †Acritohippus
 †Acritohippus isonesus
 Acropora
  †Acropora cervicornis
 †Acropora palmata
 †Acropora panamensis
 †Acropora tampaensis – type locality for species
 Acrosterigma
 †Acrosterigma declive
  Acteocina
 †Acteocina canaliculata
 †Acteocina candei
 †Acteocina fischeri
 †Acteocina incisula
 †Acteocina persimilis
 †Acteocina rusa – type locality for species
 †Acteocina sphalera – type locality for species
 †Acteocina squarrosa
 †Acteocina wetherilli
 Acteon
 †Acteon chipolanus
 †Acteon hamadryados
 †Acteon korphys – type locality for species
 †Acteon luculi
 †Acteon tampae
 †Acteon textilis
 †Acteon vaughani
 Actinocythereis
 †Actinocythereis exanthemata
  Actitis
 †Actitis macularia
 †Acuticythereis
 †Acuticythereis laevissima
 Adeonellopsis
 †Adeonellopsis galeata
 Aegolius
 †Aegolius acadicus
  †Aelurodon
 †Aelurodon taxoides
  †Aepycamelus
 †Aepycamelus major
  Aequipecten
 †Aequipecten camperilis
 †Aequipecten camperis
 †Aequipecten comparilis
 †Aequipecten eboreus
 †Aequipecten fuscopurpureus
 †Aequipecten spillmani
 †Aequipecten suwaneensis
 Aesopus
 †Aesopus proctorae
 Aetobatus
  †Aetobatus narinari
 Agaricia
 †Agaricia agaricites
 †Agaricia dominicensis
 Agaronia
 †Agaronia inglisia – type locality for species
 Agassizia
 †Agassizia clevei
 †Agassizia floridana
 †Agassizia porifera
 Agathistoma
 †Agathistoma fasciatum
 Agatrix
 Agelaius
  †Agelaius phoeniceus
 Agkistrodon
  †Agkistrodon piscivorus
 Agladrillia
 †Agladrillia agla – type locality for species
 †Agladrillia dodona – type locality for species
 †Agladrillia rabdotacoma
 †Agladrillia rabdotacona – type locality for species
 †Agladrillia rabdotocona
 †Agnotocastor
  †Agriotherium
 †Agriotherium schneideri – type locality for species
 Aix
  †Aix sponsa
 †Aizengyps
 †Aizengyps toomeyae – type locality for species
 Ajaia
  †Ajaia ajaja
 †Ajaia chione – type locality for species
 †Akleistostoma
 †Akleistostoma bairdi
 †Akleistostoma carolinensis
 †Akleistostoma crocodila
 †Akleistostoma diegelae
 †Akleistostoma erici
 †Akleistostoma floridana
 †Akleistostoma hughesi
 †Akleistostoma jenniferae
 †Akleistostoma macbrideae
 †Akleistostoma pilsbryi
 †Akleistostoma rilkoi
 †Akleistostoma transitoria
 Alaba
 †Alaba chipolana
 †Alaba dodona – type locality for species
 Alabina
 †Alabina boiplex
 †Alabina turbatrix
 †Albertella
 †Albertella alberti
 †Albertella floridana
 Alca – type locality for genus
 †Alca grandis – type locality for species
 Alderina
 †Alderina pulcherrima
  †Aletomeryx
 †Aletomeryx gracilis – or unidentified comparable form
 Aligena
 †Aligena lineata
 †Aligena pustulosa
  Alligator
 †Alligator mississipiensis
  †Alligator mississippiensis
 †Alligator olseni – type locality for species
 Alnus
 Alosa
 †Alveinus
 †Alveinus rotundus – type locality for species
  Alveopora
 †Alveopora tampae – type locality for species
 Amauropsis – report made of unidentified related form or using admittedly obsolete nomenclature
 †Amauropsis burnsii – or unidentified related form
 †Amblypygus
 †Amblypygus americanus
 †Ambystoma
 †Ambystoma tigrinum
  †Amebelodon
 †Amebelodon britti
 †Amebelodon floridanus
 Americardia
 †Americardia avona
 †Americardia avonum – type locality for species
 †Americardia burnsii
 †Americardia media
 †Americardia protoalicula
 †Americardia protoaliculum – type locality for species
  Amia
 †Amia calva
 †Amiatus
 †Amiatus calvus
  Ammodramus
 †Ammodramus maritimus
 †Ammodramus savannarum
 Amnicola
 †Amnicola adesta
 †Amnicola floridana – or unidentified related form
  †Amphicyon
 †Amphicyon longiramus – type locality for species
 †Amphicyon pontoni – type locality for species
  †Amphimachairodus
 †Amphimachairodus coloradensis – or unidentified comparable form
 †Amphiroa
 †Amphiroa americana
 Amphisorus
 Amphistegina
 †Amphistegina lessonii
 †Amphisterigina
 †Amphisterigina lessoni – or unidentified comparable form
 Amphiuma
  †Amphiuma means
 †Amplibuteo
 †Amplibuteo concordatus – type locality for species
 †Amplibuteo woodwardi
 †Ampullina
 †Ampullina flintensis
 †Ampullinopsis
 †Ampullinopsis amphora
 †Ampullinopsis citrinensis – type locality for species
 †Ampullinopsis flintensis
 Amusium
 †Amusium mertoni
 †Amusium mortoni
 †Amusium ocalanum
 †Amusium precursor
 †Anabernicula
 †Anabernicula gracilenta
 †Anabernicula minuscula – or unidentified comparable form
  Anachis
 †Anachis avara
 †Anachis caloosaensis
 †Anachis camax
 †Anachis chariessa
 †Anachis clavatula
 †Anachis dappi
 †Anachis eutheria
 †Anachis obesus
 †Anachis wieserae
 Anadara
 †Anadara acompsa
 †Anadara aequalis
 †Anadara aequalitas
 †Anadara aequlitas
 †Anadara aresta
 †Anadara callicestosa
 †Anadara campsa
 †Anadara campyla
 †Anadara cardioides – type locality for species
 †Anadara castarca
 †Anadara catasarca
 †Anadara crassicosta
 †Anadara delandensis – or unidentified comparable form
 †Anadara dodona
  †Anadara floridana
 †Anadara gunteri
 †Anadara hoerleae
 †Anadara hypomela
 †Anadara improcera
 †Anadara incongrus
 †Anadara initiator
 †Anadara latidentata
 †Anadara lienosa
 †Anadara lineolata
 †Anadara macneili – type locality for species
 †Anadara megerata
 †Anadara metastrebla
 †Anadara mikkula – type locality for species
 †Anadara mummi – type locality for species
 †Anadara notoflorida – type locality for species
 †Anadara ovalis
 †Anadara petersburgensis
 †Anadara propearesta
 †Anadara rubisiniana
 †Anadara rustica
 †Anadara santarosana – type locality for species
 †Anadara scalarina
 †Anadara scalaris
 †Anadara sellardsi
 †Anadara staminata
 †Anadara strebla
 †Anadara tarponensis
  †Anadara transversa
 †Anadara trapezia
 †Anadara tuberculosa
 †Anadara waltonia – type locality for species
 Anas
 †Anas acuta
 †Anas americana
  †Anas carolinensis
  †Anas clypeata
 †Anas crecca
   †Anas cyanoptera – or unidentified comparable form
 †Anas discors
 †Anas fulvigula
 †Anas itchtucknee – type locality for species
  †Anas platyrhynchos
  †Anas rubripes
 †Anas strepera
 Anatina
 †Anatina anatina
  †Anchitherium
 †Anchitherium clarencei – type locality for species
 Ancilla
 †Ancilla chipolana
 †Ancilla shepardi
 Angulogerina
 †Angulogerina occidentalis
 Angulus
 †Angulus agilis – or unidentified comparable form
 †Angulus merus – or unidentified comparable form
 †Angulus texanus
 †Angulus versicolor
  Anhinga
 †Anhinga anhinga
 †Anhinga grandis
 †Anhinga subvolans – type locality for species
 †Anilioides – type locality for genus
 †Anilioides minuatus – type locality for species
 †Anisaster
 †Anisaster mossomi
 Anisodonta
 †Anisodonta americana
  Anodonta
 Anodontia
 †Anodontia alba
 †Anodontia janus
 †Anodontia santarosana
 †Anodontia schrammi
 Anolis
  †Anolis carolinensis
 †Anolis morphotype A informal
 †Anolis morphotype B informal
 Anomalocardia
 †Anomalocardia aubreyana
 †Anomalocardia brasiliana
 †Anomalocardia callosa
 †Anomalocardia caloosana
 †Anomalocardia chipolana
 †Anomalocardia concinna
 †Anomalocardia cuneimeris
 †Anomalocardia hendryana
 †Anomalocardia penita
 Anomia
 †Anomia floridana
 †Anomia floridiana
 †Anomia glypta – type locality for species
 †Anomia lisbonensis
 †Anomia microgrammata
  †Anomia simplex
 †Anomia suwaneensis
 Anona
 †Anona glabra
  Antalis
 †Antalis ceratum
 †Antalis chipolanum – type locality for species
 †Antalis diopon – type locality for species
 Anthemiphyllia – tentative report
 Anticlimax
 †Anticlimax annae
 †Anticlimax calligypta
 †Anticlimax locklini
 †Anticlimax pilsbryi
 †Anticlimax tholus
 Antigona
 †Antigona listeri
 †Antiguastrea
 †Antiguastrea cellulosa
 †Antiguastrea silicensis
 Antillipecten
 †Antillipecten alumensis
 †Antillipecten anguillensis
 †Antillipecten antillarum
 †Antillipecten cercadicus
 †Antillipecten flintensis
 †Antillocyathus – tentative report
  Antillophos
 †Antillophos candeanus – or unidentified comparable form
 †Antillophos dictyola – type locality for species
 †Antillophyllia
 †Antillophyllia chipolana – type locality for species
 Antropora
 †Antropora minuta
 †Antropora octonaria
 †Antropora pyriformis
  Antrozous
 Aorotrema
 †Aorotrema cistronium
 †Aorotrema pontogenes
 Apalone
  †Apalone ferox
 Aphelocoma
  †Aphelocoma coerulescens
  †Aphelops
 †Aphelops malacorhinus
 †Aphelops mutilus
 Aphera
 †Aphera waltonensis
 †Apicula
 †Apicula apicalis
 †Apicula bowenae
 †Apicula buckinghamensis
 †Apicula gladeensis
 Aquila
 †Aquila bivia – type locality for species
  †Aquila chrysaetos
 Aquitanobursa – tentative report
 †Aquitanobursa chipolana – type locality for species. Formerly classified as Bursa chipolana. May warrant creation of new genus altogether.
 †Araloselachus
 †Araloselachus cuspidata
 †Aramides
 †Aramides cajanea
 †Aramiltha
 †Aramiltha disciformis – or unidentified related form
 Aramus
 †Aramus guarauna
 †Aramus pictus
  Arbacia
 †Arbacia crenulata
 Arca
 †Arca aquila
 †Arca grammatodonta
 †Arca imbricata
 †Arca kendrickensis
 †Arca latidentata
 †Arca limula
 †Arca mikkula
 †Arca occidentalis
 †Arca paratina
 †Arca staminata
 †Arca umbonata
 †Arca wagneriana
 †Arca williamsoni
  †Arca zebra
 †Archaeohippus
 †Archaeohippus blackbergi
 †Archaeohippus mannulus – type locality for species
 †Archaeolagus
 Archaeolithothamnium
 †Archaeolithothamnium dalloni
 †Archaeolithothamnium floridanum
 †Archaeolithothamnium gunteri
 †Archaeolithothamnium parisiense
 Archaias
 †Archimediella
 †Archimediella duplinensis
  Architectonica
 †Architectonica alvear
 †Architectonica chipolana
 †Architectonica nobilis
 †Archosargus
  †Archosargus probatocephalus
 Arcinella
  †Arcinella arcinella
 †Arcinella cornuta
 †Arcinella draconis
 †Arcohelia
 †Arcohelia limonensis
 Arcopagia
 †Arcopagia dodona
 †Arcopagia fausta
 †Arcopagia leptalea
 Arcopsis
 †Arcopsis adamsi
 †Arcoptera
 †Arcoptera wagneriana
  †Arctodus
 †Arctodus pristinus
 †Arctonasua
 †Arctonasua eurybates
 †Arctonasua floridana – type locality for species
 Ardea
  †Ardea herodias
 †Ardea polkensis – type locality for species
  Ardeola
 Argobuccinum – report made of unidentified related form or using admittedly obsolete nomenclature
 †Argobuccinum poppelacki
 Argopecten
 †Argopecten anteamplicostata
 †Argopecten anteamsolarioides
 †Argopecten chipolanus
 †Argopecten choctawhatcheensis
 †Argopecten comparilis
 †Argopecten evergladensis – type locality for species
  †Argopecten gibbus
  †Argopecten irradians
 †Argopecten irremotis
 †Argopecten jacksonensis
 †Argopecten nicholsi
 †Argopecten tamiamiensis
 †Argopecten vicenarius
 †Arikareeomys
 †Arikarictis
 †Arikarictis chapini – type locality for species
 Arius
 †Arius felis
 †Armimiltha
 †Armimiltha disciformis
 †Armimiltha heilprini – type locality for species
 Arossia
 †Arossia glyptopoma
 Artena
 †Artena glyptoconcha
 †Artena shepardi
 †Asaphis
 †Asaphis centenaria
 Asio
  †Asio flammeus
 Aspella
 †Aspella engonata
 †Aspella petuchi
 †Aspella senex – type locality for species
  Assiminea
 †Assiminea aldra
 †Astaculus
 Astarte
 †Astarte concentrica
 †Astarte eugonia – type locality for species
 †Astarte floridana
 †Astarte gleni
 †Astarte glenni
 †Astarte isosceles – type locality for species
 †Astarte isosocles
 †Astarte pansyrta – type locality for species
 †Astarte perplana – or unidentified comparable form
 †Astarte sima – type locality for species
 †Astarte symmetrica – or unidentified related form
 †Astarte vaughani
 †Astarte wagneri
 Asterosmilia
 †Asterosmilia exarata
  Astraea
 †Astraea chipolana
 †Astraea scolopax
 †Astraea tectariaformis
 †Astraea withlacoochensis
 †Astraea witlacoochensis
  Astralium
 †Astralium dalli
 †Astralium longispina
 †Astralium phoebium
 †Astralium polkensis
  Astrangia
 †Astrangia calhounensis – type locality for species
 †Astrangia floridana
 †Astrangia leonensis – type locality for species
 †Astrangia lineata
 †Astrangia talquinensis – type locality for species
 †Astrocoenia
 †Astrocoenia meinzeri
 †Astrohippus
 †Astrohippus stockii
 Astyris
 †Astyris lunata
 †Athleenia
 †Athleenia burryi
  Athleta
 †Athleta arangia – type locality for species
 †Athleta arangius
 †Atopomys
 †Atopomys texensis
 Atractosteus
 †Atractosteus spatula
 Atrina
 †Atrina caloosaensis
 †Atrina chipolana
 †Atrina quadrata
 Attiliosa
 †Attiliosa aldridgei
 †Attiliosa striata
 †Attiliosa viaavensis
  †Aturia
 †Aturia alabamensis
 †Aturia cubaensis
 Atys
 †Atys gracilis
 †Atys obscuratus
 †Atys oedemata
 †Atys sandersoni
 †Atys subscuratus
 Aurila
 †Aurila conradi
 Axelella
 †Axelella bifoliata
 †Axelella desmotis – type locality for species
 †Axelella sphenoidostoma
 †Axelella spherotoleura
 Aythya
 †Aythya affinis
 †Aythya americana
 †Aythya collaris
 †Aythya marila
 †Aythya valisineria
 †Aztlanolagus

B

 †Babelomurex
 †Babelomurex lindae
 Bactridium
 †Bactridium ellipticum
 †Bactridium sexordinatum
 †Bactridium teges
 Bailya
 †Bailya intricata
 †Bailya roycei
 Baiomys
 Bairdiella
  †Bairdiella chrysoura
 Balaenoptera
  †Balaenoptera acutorostrata
 †Balaenoptera floridana – type locality for species
 Balanus
 †Balanus bloxhamensis
 †Balanus humilis
 †Balanus improvisus – or unidentified related form
 †Balanus leonensis
 †Balanus newburnensis
 †Balanus niveus
 †Balanus ochlockoneensis
 †Balanus ochlockonensis
  †Balanus trigonus
 Balcis
 †Balcis biconica
  Balistes
 Bambusum
 †Bambusum heladum
 Barbatia
 †Barbatia candida
 †Barbatia inglisia – type locality for species
 †Barbatia marylandica
 †Barbatia palmerae – type locality for species
 †Barbatia propatula
  †Barbourofelis
 †Barbourofelis loveorum
 Bartschella
 †Bartschella parkeri – or unidentified comparable form
 Basiliscus – or unidentified comparable form
  †Basilosaurus
 †Basilosaurus cetoides
 †Bassaricyonoides
 †Bassaricyonoides phyllismillerae – type locality for species
 Basterotia
 †Basterotia ambona – type locality for species
 †Basterotia elliptica
 †Basterotia floridana
 †Basterotia miocenica – type locality for species
 Bathypsammia
 Bathytormus
 †Bathytormus protextus
  Batillaria
 †Batillaria advena – type locality for species
 †Batillaria minima
 †Batrachosauroides
 †Batrachosauroides dissimulans
 Beisselina
 †Beisselina implicata
 Bela
 †Bela nassoides – type locality for species
 †Bellatara
 †Bellatara americana – type locality for species
 †Bellatara citrana – type locality for species
 †Bellatara floridana – type locality for species
 Bellucina
 †Bellucina waccamawensis
 †Benzoin
  †Benzoin melissaefolium – or unidentified comparable form
 Bicorbula
 Bigenerina
 †Bigenerina floridana
 Biomphalaria
  †Biomphalaria havanensis
 Bison
  †Bison antiquus
  †Bison latifrons
 Bittiolum
 †Bittiolum podagrinum
 †Bittiolum varium
 Bittium
 †Bittium adela
 †Bittium caseyi
 †Bittium podagrinum
 †Bittium priscum
 †Bittium serenum – type locality for species
 †Bittium sora
 Bivetopsia
 †Bivetopsia rugosa
 †Blagraveia – tentative report
 †Blagraveia gunteri – type locality for species
 Blarina
  †Blarina brevicauda
  †Blarina carolinensis
  †Blastomeryx
 Boa
  †Boa constrictor – type locality for species
 Bolivina
 †Bolivina floridana
 †Bolivina marginata
 †Bolivina paula
 †Bolivina pulchella
 Bonasa
 †Bonasa umbellus
 Boonea
 †Boonea seminuda
 †Boreortalis – type locality for genus
 †Boreortalis laesslei – type locality for species
 Bornia
 †Bornia dodona
 †Bornia floridana
 †Bornia lioica
 †Bornia mazyckii
 †Bornia tampae
 †Bornia triangula – or unidentified comparable form
  †Borophagus
 †Borophagus diversidens
 †Borophagus hilli
 †Borophagus orc
 †Borophagus pugnator
 Bostrycapulus
 †Bostrycapulus aculeatus
 Botaurus
 †Botaurus lentiginosus
  †Bothriodon
 †Bothrocorbula
 †Bothrocorbula radiatula
 †Bothrocorbula synarmostes
 †Bothrocorbula wilcoxii
 Botula
 †Botula cinnamomeus
 †Botula fusca
 †Bouromeryx
 †Bouromeryx americanus
 Bracebridgia
 †Bracebridgia aculeata
 Brachidontes
 †Brachidontes curtulus
 †Brachidontes exustus
 †Brachidontes vetustus
 Brachiodontes
 †Brachiodontes exustis
 †Brachiodontes exustus
  †Brachycythara
 †Brachycythara dasa – type locality for species
 †Brachycythara gordonae
 †Brachycythara terminula
 †Brachysycon
 †Brachysycon amoenum
 †Brachysycon kissimmeensis
 †Brachysycon propeincile
 †Brachysyon
 †Brachysyon willcoxi
 †Brana
 †Brana dickeyi
 Branta
  †Branta canadensis
 †Brasenia
 †Brasenia purpurea
 †Brissopatagus
 Brissopsis
 Brissus
 Bubo
  †Bubo virginianus
 Buccella
 †Buccella hannai
 Buccinum
 †Buccinum contrarium
 Bucephala
 †Bucephala albeola
 †Bucephala ossivallis
 Buchema
 Bufo
 †Bufo defensor – type locality for species
 †Bufo praevius
  †Bufo quercicus
 †Bufo terrestris
 †Bufo tiheni – type locality for species
  †Bufo woodhousei
 Bulimina
 †Bulimina gracilis
 Buliminella
 †Buliminella curta
 †Buliminella elegantissima
  Bulimulus
 †Bulimulus ballistae
 †Bulimulus floridanus
 †Bulimulus heilprinianus
 †Bulimulus remolinus
 †Bulimulus stearnsii
 †Bulimulus tampae
 †Bulimulus tortillus
 Bulla
 †Bulla petrosa
 †Bulla sarasotaensis
 †Bulla striata
 †Bulla umbilicata
 Bullaria
 Bursa
 †Bursa amphritrites
 †Bursa chipolana – type locality for species. Later reclassified in the genus Aquitanobursa.
 †Bursa rhodostoma
  †Bursa rugosa
 Busycon
 †Busycon aldrichi – type locality for species
 †Busycon atraktoides – type locality for species
 †Busycon basingerensis
 †Busycon bladenense
 †Busycon burnsii
 †Busycon caloosahatcheensis
 †Busycon cannoni
 †Busycon capelettii
  †Busycon carica
 †Busycon carolinensis
 †Busycon carraheri
 †Busycon chowanense
   †Busycon contrarium
 †Busycon dalli
 †Busycon dasum – type locality for species
 †Busycon demistriatum
 †Busycon duerri
 †Busycon echinatum
 †Busycon eismonti
 †Busycon elongatus
 †Busycon epispiniger – type locality for species
 †Busycon excavatum
 †Busycon federicoae
 †Busycon filosum
 †Busycon floridanus
 †Busycon grabaui
 †Busycon griffini
 †Busycon harasewychi
 †Busycon helenae
 †Busycon holeylandica
 †Busycon hollisteri
 †Busycon jonesae
 †Busycon labellensis
 †Busycon laevis
 †Busycon lindajoyceae
 †Busycon maximum
 †Busycon miamiensis
 †Busycon montforti
 †Busycon montfortis
 †Busycon obrapum – or unidentified related form
 †Busycon ovoidea
 †Busycon pachyus
 †Busycon palmbeachensis
 †Busycon pamlico
 †Busycon perversum
 †Busycon planulatum
 †Busycon radix – type locality for species
 †Busycon radula
 †Busycon rapum
 †Busycon roseae
 †Busycon rugosicostata
 †Busycon schmidti
 †Busycon sicyoides – type locality for species
 †Busycon sinistrum
 †Busycon soror
 †Busycon stellatum
 †Busycon superbus
 †Busycon tampaense
 †Busycon titan
 †Busycon tomeui
 †Busycon tropicalis
 †Busycon tudiculatum
 †Busycon turbinalis
 †Busycon waltfrancei
 †Busycon yeehaw
 Busycotypus
 †Busycotypus aepynotum
 †Busycotypus bicoronatum
 †Busycotypus canaliculatus
 †Busycotypus incile
 †Busycotypus libertiensis
 †Busycotypus scotti
 †Busycotypus spiratus
 Buteo
  †Buteo jamaicensis
  †Buteo lineatus
  †Buteo platypterus
 †Buteo swainsoni
 Buteogallus
 †Buteogallus fragilis
 †Buteogallus urubitinga
 Butorides
 †Butorides validipes – type locality for species
  †Butorides virescens

C

 Cadulus
 †Cadulus blountense
 †Cadulus carolinensis
 †Cadulus floridanus
 †Cadulus quadridentatus
 †Cadulus tetrodon
 †Cadulus thallus
 Caecum
 †Caecum chipolanum
 †Caecum cinctum
 †Caecum circumvolutum
 †Caecum cooperi
 †Caecum cornellum
 †Caecum cycloferum
 †Caecum floridanum
 †Caecum imbricatum
 †Caecum pararegulare – type locality for species
 †Caecum pulchellum
 †Caecum regulare
 †Caecum strigosum
 †Caecum tortile
 †Calamagras
 †Calamagras floridanus – type locality for species
 †Calamagras platyspondyla
 Calidris
 †Calidris albus – or unidentified comparable form
  †Calidris canutus – or unidentified comparable form
 †Calidris pacis – type locality for species
  †Calidris pusilla – or unidentified comparable form
 †Calippus
 †Calippus cerasinus
 †Calippus elachistus
 †Calippus hondurensis
 †Calippus maccartyi
 †Calippus martini
 †Calippus proplacidus
 Callianassa
 †Callianassa inglisestris – type locality for species
 Calliostoma
 †Calliostoma ceramicum
 †Calliostoma euconulum
  †Calliostoma euglyptum
 †Calliostoma exile
 †Calliostoma flumenvadum – type locality for species
 †Calliostoma grammaticum
  †Calliostoma jujubinum
 †Calliostoma jujucanulum
 †Calliostoma jujuconulum
 †Calliostoma lindae
 †Calliostoma metrium
 †Calliostoma pauli
 †Calliostoma permagnum
 †Calliostoma philanthropus
 †Calliostoma philonthopus
 †Calliostoma prejujubinum
 †Calliostoma pulchrum
 †Calliostoma rhombotoide – type locality for species
  †Calliostoma roseolum
 †Calliostoma rugabasis – type locality for species
 †Calliostoma seminolum
 †Calliostoma silicatum
 †Calliostoma sincerum
  †Calliostoma tampaense
 †Calliostoma tampicum
 †Calliostoma willcoxianum
  †Calliostoma yucatecanum – or unidentified comparable form
 Callista
 †Callista annexa
 Calloarca
 †Calloarca irregularis
 †Calloarca lenensis
 †Calloarca phalacra
 †Calloarca taeniata
 Callocardia
 †Callocardia albofonte – type locality for species
 †Callocardia nux
 †Callocardia prosayana – type locality for species
 †Callocardia silicata
 †Callocardia sincera
 †Callophoca
 †Callophoca obscura
 Callucina
 †Callucina cala
 †Callucina keenae
 †Calodiscus
 †Calodiscus retiferus
 †Caloosarca
 †Caloosarca aequilitas
 †Calophos
 †Calophos nanus
 †Calophos plicatile
 †Calophos wilsoni
 Calotrophon
 †Calotrophon multangula
 †Calotrophon myakka
 †Calotrophon ostrearum
 †Calotrophon phagon
 †Calusaconus
 †Calusaconus evergladensis
 †Calusaconus spuroides
 †Calusaconus tomeui
 †Calusacypraea
 †Calusacypraea briani
 †Calusacypraea globulina
 †Calusacypraea sarasotaensis
 †Calusacypraea tequesta
  Calyptraea
 †Calyptraea centralis
 †Calyptraea conradi
   †Camelops
 Campylocythere
 Cancellaria
 †Cancellaria aldrichi
 †Cancellaria amoena
 †Cancellaria ancycla – type locality for species
 †Cancellaria atraktoides
 †Cancellaria calusa
 †Cancellaria cannoni
 †Cancellaria clewistonensis
 †Cancellaria conradiana
 †Cancellaria defuniak – type locality for species
 †Cancellaria druidarum – type locality for species
 †Cancellaria ecuheea
 †Cancellaria eucheea – type locality for species
 †Cancellaria floridana
 †Cancellaria mitrodita – type locality for species
 †Cancellaria paramoorei – type locality for species
 †Cancellaria pinguis – type locality for species
  †Cancellaria reticulata
 †Cancellaria rotunda
 †Cancellaria spherotopleura – type locality for species
 †Cancellaria stibara – type locality for species
 †Cancellaria subtiarophora
 †Cancellaria tabulata
 †Cancellaria waltoniana – type locality for species
  Cancilla
 †Cancilla desmia
 Cancris
 †Cancris sagra
 Canis
  †Canis armbrusteri
  †Canis dirus – type locality for species
 †Canis edwardii
 †Canis familiaris
  †Canis latrans
 †Canis lepophagus
 †Canis lupus
  †Canis rufus
 Cantharus
 †Cantharus clarksvillensis
 †Cantharus multangulata
 †Cantharus pauper
 Capella
 †Capella delicata
  †Capromeryx
 †Capromeryx arizonensis
 Capulus
 †Capulus chipolanus – type locality for species
 Caracara
 †Caracara cheriway
 †Caracara plancus
 †Caracara prelutosa
 †Caracara prelutosus
 Caranx
 †Caranx hippos
 Carcharhinus
 †Carcharhinus brevipinna
 †Carcharhinus leucas
 †Carcharhinus limbatus
 †Carcharhinus plumbeus
 †Carcharhinus signatus
 Carcharias
 †Carcharias taurus
 Carcharodon
 †Carcharodon auriculatus
  †Carcharodon carcharias
  †Carcharodon hastalis
 †Carcharodon subauriculatus
 Cardinalis
  †Cardinalis cardinalis
 Cardiolucina
 †Cardiolucina multistriatus
 †Cardiolucina parawhitfieldi – type locality for species
 Cardiomya
 †Cardiomya costellata
 †Cardiomya mansfieldi
 †Cardiomya orbignyi
 †Cardiomya ornatissima
 Cardita
 †Cardita apotegea
 †Cardita liveoakensis
 †Cardita seminolensis
 †Cardita shepardi
 Carditamera
 †Carditamera anclotensis
 †Carditamera apotegea – type locality for species
 †Carditamera arata
 †Carditamera catharia
 †Carditamera dasytes
 †Carditamera defuniak – type locality for species
 †Carditamera floridana
 †Carditamera tegea
 †Carditamera vaughani
 Cardium
 †Cardium aclinensis
 †Cardium brooksvillensis
 †Cardium gadsdenense – or unidentified comparable form
 †Cardium hernandoense – or unidentified related form
 †Cardium hernandoensis
 †Cardium panastrum
 †Cardium precursor
 †Cardium suwannense
 Caretta
  †Caretta caretta
  †Carex
 †Caricella
 †Caricella florea – type locality for species
 †Caricella obsoleta – type locality for species
 †Caricella pycnoplecta – type locality for species
 Carinodrillia
 †Carinodrillia cymatoides – type locality for species
 †Carinodrillia pylonia
 †Carolia
 †Carolia floridana
 †Carolinapecten
 †Carolinapecten darlingtonensis
 †Carolinapecten eboreus
 †Carolinapecten jamieae
 †Carolinapecten senescens
 †Carolinapecten solaroides
 †Carolinapecten urbannaensis
 †Carolinapecten walkerensis
 †Carolinapecten watsonensis
 †Carolinapecten yorkensis
 †Carpella
 †Carpella gallinago
 Carphophis
  †Carphophis amoenus
 †Carpocyon
 †Carpocyon limosus – type locality for species
  Carya
  Carychium
 †Carychium mexicanum
 Caryocorbula
 †Caryocorbula cala
 †Caryocorbula caribaea
 †Caryocorbula contracta
 †Caryocorbula cuneata
 †Caryocorbula densata
 †Caryocorbula funiakensis
 †Caryocorbula leonensis
 †Caryocorbula parawhitfieldi
 †Caryocorbula seminella
 †Caryocorbula whitfieldi
 †Casmerodius
  †Casmerodius albus
 Cassidulina
 †Cassidulina crassa
 †Cassidulina laevigata
 Cassidulinoides
 †Cassidulinoides braydi
 Cassis
 †Cassis delta
 †Cassis flintensis
 †Cassis floridensis
 †Cassis jameshoubricki
 †Cassis ketteri
  †Cassis madagascariensis
 †Cassis schnirei
 Castanea
 Castor
 †Castor californicus
  †Castor canadensis
  †Castoroides
 †Castoroides leiseyorum – type locality for species
 †Castoroides ohioensis
 Cathartes
  †Cathartes aura
 Catharus
 Cavilinga
 †Cavilinga blanda
 †Cavilinga trisulcata
 Celleporaria
 †Celleporaria fissurata
 Celleporina
 †Celleporina umbonata
 †Celliforma
 †Celliforma nuda
 †Centetodon
 †Centetodon magnus
  Centropomus
 †Cepolis
 †Cepolis instrumosa
 †Cepolis latebrosa
  Cerastoderma
 †Cerastoderma chipolanum
 †Cerastoderma druidicum
 †Cerastoderma panastrum
 †Cerastoderma waltonianum
 †Cerion
 †Cerion anodonta
  Cerithidea
 †Cerithidea briani
 †Cerithidea costatus
 †Cerithidea diegelae
 †Cerithidea duerri
 †Cerithidea jenniferae
 †Cerithidea lindae
  †Cerithidea pliculosa
 †Cerithidea scalariformis
 †Cerithidea xenos
 Cerithioclava
 †Cerithioclava caloosaensis
 †Cerithioclava caloosanae
 †Cerithioclava eutextile
 †Cerithioclava turriculus
 Cerithiopsis
 †Cerithiopsis aralia
 †Cerithiopsis dauca
 †Cerithiopsis greenii
 †Cerithiopsis inopinus – type locality for species
 †Cerithiopsis silicata
 †Cerithiopsis vinca
  Cerithium
 †Cerithium atratum
 †Cerithium caloosaene
 †Cerithium caloosaense
 †Cerithium caloosaensis
 †Cerithium coccodes
 †Cerithium cookei
 †Cerithium dominicense
 †Cerithium eburneum
 †Cerithium georgianum – or unidentified related form
 †Cerithium glaphyrea
 †Cerithium guinaicum
 †Cerithium harveyensis
 †Cerithium hernandoensis
 †Cerithium insulatum
 †Cerithium litharium
 †Cerithium lutosum
  †Cerithium muscarum
 †Cerithium obesum
 †Cerithium ornatissimum
 †Cerithium plectrum
 †Cerithium praecursor
 †Cerithium suwannensis
 †Cerithium turriculum
 Cerodrillia
 †Cerodrillia simpsoni
 †Certhioclava
 †Certhioclava garciai
  Ceryle
 †Ceryle torquata
 †Cestumcerithium
 †Cestumcerithium brooksvillensis
 †Cestumcerithium liveoakensis
 †Cestumcerithium pascoensis
 †Cestumcerithium vaginatum
 Chaetopleura
  †Chaetopleura apiculata
 Chama
 †Chama caloosana
 †Chama congregata
 †Chama corticosa
 †Chama gardnerae
 †Chama heilprini
 †Chama hillsboroughensis
 †Chama macerophylla
 †Chama radians
 †Chama spinosa
 †Chama tampaensis
 †Chama willcoxii
  Chamelea
 †Chamelea rhodia
 †Chamelea spada
 Charadrius
 †Charadrius vociferus
  †Chasmaporthetes
 †Chasmaporthetes ossifragus
 Cheilea
 †Cheilea uncinata – type locality for species
 Cheiloporina
 †Cheiloporina bellensis – type locality for species
 †Cheiloporina saillans
 Chelonia
  †Chelonia mydas
 Chelonibia
 †Chelonibia patula
 †Chelonibia testudinaria
 Chelydra
 †Chelydra floridana
 †Chelydra sculpta
 †Chelydra serpentina
 Chemnitzia
 †Chesacardium
 †Chesacardium laqueatum
 †Chesaconcavus
 †Chesaconcavus tamiamiensis
 †Chesapecten
 †Chesapecten decemnarius
  †Chesapecten jeffersonius
 †Chesapecten madisonius
 †Chesapecten middlesexensis
 †Chesapecten palmyrensis
  Chicoreus
 †Chicoreus aldrichi – type locality for species
  †Chicoreus brevifrons
 †Chicoreus brevis
 †Chicoreus burnsii
 †Chicoreus calusa
 †Chicoreus chipolanus
 †Chicoreus cornurectus
 †Chicoreus dilectus
 †Chicoreus duerri
 †Chicoreus dujardinoides
 †Chicoreus elusivus
 †Chicoreus floridanus
 †Chicoreus floridensis
 †Chicoreus folidodes – type locality for species
 †Chicoreus gravesae
 †Chicoreus judeae
 †Chicoreus juliagardnerae – type locality for species
 †Chicoreus lepidotus
 †Chicoreus miccosukee
 †Chicoreus nicholsi
 †Chicoreus pyknos
 †Chicoreus sarae
 †Chicoreus shirleyae
 †Chicoreus stephensae
 †Chicoreus stetopus
 †Chicoreus susanae
 †Chicoreus xestos
  Chilomycterus
 Chione
 †Chione ballista
 †Chione burnsii
  †Chione cancellata
 †Chione chipolana
 †Chione cortinaria
 †Chione cribaria
 †Chione cribraria
 †Chione elevata
 †Chione erosa
 †Chione gardnerae
 †Chione interpurpurea
 †Chione moristans
 †Chione morsitans
 †Chione nuciformis
 †Chione procancellata
 Chionopsis
 †Chionopsis bainbridgensis
 †Chionopsis intapurpurea
 †Chionopsis spenceri – or unidentified comparable form
  Chlamys
 †Chlamys anatipes
 †Chlamys brooksvillensis
 †Chlamys buckinghamensis
 †Chlamys caloosensis
 †Chlamys clinchfieldensis
 †Chlamys condylomatus
 †Chlamys crocus
 †Chlamys eboreus
 †Chlamys indecisa
 †Chlamys liveoakensis
 †Chlamys nematopleura
 †Chlamys nicholsi – type locality for species
 †Chlamys nupera
 †Chlamys sayanus
 †Chlamys solarioides
 †Chlamys spillmani
 †Chlamys vaun – or unidentified related form
  Chlorostoma
 †Chlorostoma exoletus
 †Chlorostoma exolutum
 Chondestes – or unidentified comparable form
  †Chondestes grammacus
 Choristodon
 †Choristodon robustus
  Chrysallida
 †Chrysallida locklini – or unidentified comparable form
 †Chrysallida macneili
  Chrysemys
 †Chrysemys floridana
 †Chrysemys nelsoni
 †Chrysemys scripta
 †Chrysemys williamsi
  Cibicides
 †Cibicides concentricus
 †Cibicides deprimus
 †Cibicides floridanus
 †Cibicides lobatulus
 †Cibicides mississippiensis
 Ciconia
  †Ciconia maltha
 Cidaris
 †Cidaris mortoni
 Cinctura
 †Cinctura capelettii
 †Cinctura evergladensis
 †Cinctura holeylandica
 †Cinctura hunteria
 †Cinctura lilium
 †Cinctura lindae
 †Cinctura rhomboidea
 †Cinctura rucksorum
 †Cinctura sarasotaensis
 Circulus
 †Circulus anthera – type locality for species
 †Circulus gunteri
 †Circulus mitorraphes – type locality for species
 †Circulus trilix
 Circus
  †Circus cyaneus – or unidentified comparable form
 Cirsotrema
 †Cirsotrema cirritum
 †Cirsotrema dalli
 Cistothorus
 †Cistothorus brevis
 †Cistothorus platensis
  Cladocora
 †Cladocora arbuscula
 †Cladocora johnsoni
 Clangula
  †Clangula hyemalis
  Clathrodrillia
 †Clathrodrillia aulakoessa – type locality for species
 †Clathrodrillia ebinina
 †Clathrodrillia emmonsi
 †Clathrodrillia empera – type locality for species
 †Clathrodrillia gracilina
 †Clathrodrillia perspirata – tentative report
 †Clathrodrillia podagrina
 †Clathrodrillia subvaricosa – type locality for species
 Clathrus
 †Clathrus antillarum
 †Clathrus junceum
 †Clathrus obtusum
 †Clathrus rupicolum
 Clava
 †Clava menthafontis
 †Clava silicium
  Clavatula
 †Clavatula anthera – type locality for species
 †Clavatula apoia
 †Clavatula compsa – type locality for species
 †Clavatula elatocompsa – type locality for species
 †Clavatula eleutheria – type locality for species
 †Clavatula euparypha – type locality for species
 †Clavatula grabaui
 †Clavatula gunteri – type locality for species
 †Clavatula habra – type locality for species
 †Clavatula kalliglypta – type locality for species
 †Clavatula libertalis – type locality for species
 †Clavatula panopla – type locality for species
 †Clavatula polyploka – type locality for species
 †Clavatula proebenina – type locality for species
 †Clavatula vandenbroecki
 †Clavolithes
 †Clavolithes vicksburgensis
 Clavus
 †Clavus blacki
 †Clavus centrodes – type locality for species
 †Clavus coryphodes – type locality for species
 †Clavus eurysoma – type locality for species
 †Clavus eurystoma
 †Clavus haraldi – type locality for species
 †Clavus illiota
 †Clavus lunata
 †Clavus microneta – type locality for species
 †Clavus pachycheila
 †Clavus pleutonica – or unidentified related form
 †Clavus pogodula
 †Clavus prion – type locality for species
 †Clavus pycnoklosta – type locality for species
 †Clavus silfa
 †Clavus trimitrodita – type locality for species
 †Clavus trypanion – type locality for species
 †Clavus waltoniana – type locality for species
 †Clavus zosta – type locality for species
 Clementia
 †Clementia grayi
 †Clementia inoceriformis
 Clidiophora
 †Clidiophora crassidens – or unidentified comparable form
 †Climacoida
 Climacoidea
 †Climacoidea pleurata
 Closia
 †Closia antiqua
 †Closia popenoei
  Clypeaster
 †Clypeaster cotteaui
 †Clypeaster oxybaphon
 †Clypeaster rogersi
 †Clypeaster rosaceus
 †Clypeaster sunnilandensis
 Cnemidophorus
  †Cnemidophorus sexlineatus
 Coccyzus
  †Coccyzus americanus
  Cochlespira
 †Cochliolepas
 Cochliolepis
 †Cochliolepis arietina – type locality for species
 †Cochliolepis holmesi
 †Cochliolepis nautiformis
 †Cochliolepis striata
  Codakia
 †Codakia chipolana
 †Codakia erosa – or unidentified related form
 †Codakia orbicularis
 Colaptes
  †Colaptes auratus
 Colinus
 †Colinus suilium – type locality for species
  †Colinus virginianus
 †Collinus
 Colpophyllia
  †Colpophyllia natans
 Coluber
 †Coluber constrictor
 Columba
 †Columba fasciata
 Columbella
  †Columbella mercatoria
 †Columbella rusticoides
 †Columbella submercatoria
 Columbellopsis
 †Columbellopsis nycteis – or unidentified comparable form
 Compsodrillia
 †Compsodrillia calesi
 †Compsodrillia drewi
 †Compsodrillia lipana
 †Conantophis – type locality for genus
 †Conantophis alachuaensis – type locality for species
  Concavus
 †Concavus concavus
 †Concavus crassostricola
 †Concavus sarasotaensis
 †Concholepas
 †Concholepas drezi – type locality for species
 Conepatus
  †Conepatus leuconotus
 †Conepatus robustus – type locality for species
 Conomitra
 †Conomitra angulata
 †Conomitra apalachee – type locality for species
 †Conomitra crenulata
 †Conomitra kendrewi
 †Conomitra staminea
 †Conorbis
 †Conorbis porcellanus
 †Conradostrea
 †Conradostrea lawrencei
 †Conradostrea sculpturata
 †Conradostrea scuplturata
 Conus
 †Conus adversarius
 †Conus alleni
 †Conus ambonos
  †Conus anabathrum
 †Conus aneuretos – type locality for species
 †Conus aquoreus – type locality for species
 †Conus chipolanus
 †Conus cookei
 †Conus corrugatus – type locality for species
  †Conus daucus
 
†Conus delessertii
 †Conus deluvianus
 †Conus demiurgus
 †Conus designatus
 †Conus dodona – type locality for species
 †Conus drezi
 †Conus drezki – type locality for species
 †Conus duidi
 †Conus erugatus – type locality for species
 †Conus evergladensis
 †Conus eversoni – or unidentified comparable form
 †Conus fusiformis – type locality for species
 †Conus gardnerae – type locality for species
 †Conus harveyensis
 †Conus hertwecki
 †Conus hyshugari
 †Conus iliolus
 †Conus imitator – or unidentified related form
 †Conus infulatus
 †Conus isomatratus
 †Conus isomitratus
 †Conus jaclynae
  †Conus jaspideus – type locality for species
 †Conus jonesorum
 †Conus kendrewi
 †Conus largillierti
 †Conus laurenae
 †Conus martinshugari
 †Conus marylandicus
 †Conus marysmansfieldae
 †Conus maureenae
 †Conus miamiensis
 †Conus molis
 †Conus nemorideditus – type locality for species
 †Conus palmbeachensis
 †Conus palmerae
 †Conus parkeri
 †Conus patglicksteinae
  †Conus patricius
 †Conus phluegeri
 †Conus planiceps
 †Conus praecipuus
 †Conus rapunculus – type locality for species
 †Conus robertsi
 †Conus ronaldsmithi
 †Conus sauridens – type locality for species
  †Conus sennottorum
 †Conus sextoni – type locality for species
  †Conus spurius
 †Conus spuroides
 †Conus submoniliferus – type locality for species
 †Conus sulculus
 †Conus suproides
 †Conus tapetus
 †Conus trajectionis – type locality for species
 †Conus tricoratus – type locality for species
 †Conus vegrandis
 †Conus vitius – type locality for species
 †Conus waccamawensis
 †Conus waltonensis – type locality for species
 †Conus yaquensis
 †Copemys
 Coragyps
  †Coragyps atratus
 †Coragyps attratus
 †Coragyps occidentalis
 †Coragyps urubu
 Coralliophaga
 †Coralliophaga coralliophaga
 †Coralliophaga elegantula
  Coralliophila
 †Coralliophila magna
 †Coralliophila mansfieldi
 †Coralliophila miocenica
  Corbula
 †Corbula anteniae
 †Corbula burnsii
 †Corbula cala
 †Corbula caloosae
 †Corbula chipolana – type locality for species
 †Corbula franci – type locality for species
 †Corbula funiakensis – type locality for species
 †Corbula inaequalis
 †Corbula kaghriana
 †Corbula krebsiana
 †Corbula nucleata
 †Corbula parawhitfieldi – type locality for species
 †Corbula sarda
 †Corbula semenoides – type locality for species
 †Corbula seminella
 †Corbula sphenia
 †Corbula wakullensis – type locality for species
 †Corbula waltonensis – type locality for species
  †Cormocyon
 †Cormocyon copei – or unidentified comparable form
  †Cormohipparion
 †Cormohipparion emsliei
 †Cormohipparion goorisi
 †Cormohipparion ingenuum
 †Cormohipparion occidentale
 †Cormohipparion plicatile
 Corvus
 †Corvus brachyrhynchos
  †Corvus ossifragus
  †Corylus
 †Corystosiren
 †Corystosiren varguezi
 †Coskinolina
 †Coskinolina floridana
 Cosmotriphora
 †Cosmotriphora dupliniana
 †Cosmotriphora melanura
 †Costaglycymeris
 †Costaglycymeris drymanos – type locality for species
 †Costaglycymeris subovata
 †Costaglycymeris waltonensis – type locality for species
 Coturnicops
  †Coturnicops noveboracensis
 Crassatella
 †Crassatella deformis
 †Crassatella densus
 †Crassatella eutawacolens
 †Crassatella eutawcolens
 †Crassatella inglisia – type locality for species
 †Crassatella ocordia
 †Crassatella porcus
 †Crassatella portelli
 †Crassatella tanicus
 Crassatellites
 †Crassatellites meridionalis
 Crassimarginatella
 †Crassimarginatella crassimarginata
 Crassinella
 †Crassinella acuta
 †Crassinella dupliniana
 †Crassinella lunulata
 †Crassinella tanica
 †Crassinella tanicus
 †Crassinella triangulatus
 †Crassinella waltoniana
  Crassispira
 †Crassispira boadicea
 †Crassispira calligona
 †Crassispira eupatoria
 †Crassispira laurentii – type locality for species
 †Crassispira loxa – type locality for species
 †Crassispira lyopleura
 †Crassispira meunieri
 †Crassispira perrugata
 †Crassispira sella
 †Crassispira smilia
  Crassostrea
 †Crassostrea labellensis
 †Crassostrea normalis
 †Crassostrea virginica
 †Cremaster – type locality for genus
 †Cremaster
 †Cremaster tytthus – type locality for species
 †Crenatosiren – type locality for genus
 †Crenatosiren olseni
 Crenella
 †Crenella decussata
 †Crenella minuscula
 Crepidula
 †Crepidula aesop
 †Crepidula cannoni
 †Crepidula convexa
 †Crepidula cymbaeformis
  †Crepidula fornicata
 †Crepidula fornicula
  †Crepidula maculosa
  †Crepidula plana
 †Crepidula ponderosa
 †Crepidula rhysseama
 †Crepidula rhyssema
 †Crepidula rostrata
 Crepipatella
 †Crepipatella apprimus
 †Creusia
 †Creusia neogenica
 †Cribrendoecium
 †Cribrendoecium tenuicostulatum
 †Crommium
 †Crommium ocalanum
 Crotalus
  †Crotalus adamanteus
 †Crotalus giganteus
 Crucibulum
 †Crucibulum auricula
 †Crucibulum chipolanum
 †Crucibulum constrictum
 †Crucibulum costataum
 †Crucibulum grande
 †Crucibulum imbricatum
 †Crucibulum multilineata
 †Crucibulum multilineatum
 †Crucibulum ramosum
  †Crucibulum spinosum
 †Crucibulum striata
  †Crucibulum striatum
 †Crucibulum waltonense – type locality for species
 Cryptotis
  †Cryptotis parva
 †Cryrenoida
 †Cryrenoida floridana
 Ctena
 †Ctena chipolana
 †Ctena erosa
 †Ctena leonensis
 †Ctena magnoliana
 †Ctena orbiculata
 †Ctena scurra
 †Ctena speciosa
 Ctenoides
 †Ctenoides floridana
 †Ctenoides scabra
 †Cubitostrea
 †Cubitostrea pauciplicata
 †Cubitostrea rugifera
 Cumingia
 †Cumingia amydra
 †Cumingia lamellosa
 †Cumingia tellinoides
 †Cuneocorbula
 †Cuneocorbula whitfieldi
 Cupuladria
 †Cupuladria biporosa
 Cupularia
 †Cupularia denticulata
 Cuvierina
 †Cuvierina columnella
  †Cuvieronius
 †Cuvieronius tropicus
 Cyanocitta
  †Cyanocitta cristata
 Cyclinella
 †Cyclinella tenuis
 Cyclocardia
 †Cyclocardia granulata
 Cyclopecten
 †Cyclopecten defuniak – type locality for species
 †Cyclopecten diktuotus – type locality for species
 Cyclostremiscus
 †Cyclostremiscus anthera
 †Cyclostremiscus bartschi
 †Cyclostremiscus beaui
 †Cyclostremiscus beauii
 †Cyclostremiscus fargoi
 †Cyclostremiscus gunteri
 †Cyclostremiscus mitorraphes
 †Cyclostremiscus olssoni
 †Cyclostremiscus pentagonus
 †Cyclostremiscus stirophorus
 †Cyclostremiscus trilex – tentative report
 †Cyclostremiscus trilix
 Cygnus
  †Cygnus buccinator
  †Cygnus columbianus
 Cylichna
 †Cylichna anthera – type locality for species
 †Cylichna decapitata
 †Cylichna quercinensis
 Cylichnella
 †Cylichnella bidentata
 †Cylichnella biplicata
 †Cylichnella gabbi
 †Cylichnella jacksonensis
 †Cymakra
 †Cymakra poncei
 Cymatium
 Cymatoica
 †Cymatoica orientalis
 Cymatophos
 †Cymatophos lindae
  Cymatosyrinx
 †Cymatosyrinx aclinica
 †Cymatosyrinx louisae – or unidentified comparable form
 †Cymatosyrinx lunata
 †Cymatosyrinx perplota
 †Cymatosyrinx perpolita
 †Cymatosyrinx vaughanensis
 Cymbovula
 †Cymbovula acicularis
  Cymodocea
 †Cymodocea floridana – type locality for species
  †Cynarctoides
 †Cynarctoides lemur
  †Cynelos
 †Cynelos caroniavorus
 †Cynorca
  Cynoscion
  †Cynthiacetus
 †Cynthiacetus maxwelli
 Cyphastrea
 †Cyphastrea tampae – type locality for species
 Cyphoma
 †Cyphoma carolae
 †Cyphoma finkli
  †Cyphoma gibbosum
 †Cyphoma intermedium
 †Cyphoma miamiensis
 †Cyphoma viaavensis
  Cypraea
 †Cypraea problematica
  Cypraecassis
 †Cypraecassis chipolana
 Cypraedia
 †Cypraedia fenestralis
 Cypraeolina
 †Cypraeolina defuniak – type locality for species
 †Cypraeolina pyrenoides – type locality for species
 †Cypraeorbis
 †Cypraeorbis arlettae – type locality for species
 †Cypraeorbis heilprinii
 †Cypraeorbis kendrewi
 †Cypraeorbis willcoxi – type locality for species
 Cyprideis
 †Cyrbasia
 †Cyrbasia brassica
 †Cyrbasia maisana
 †Cyrbasia ophiura
 Cyrena
 †Cyrena floridana
 †Cyrena pompholyx
 †Cyrenoida
 †Cyrenoida floridana
 Cyrtopleura
 †Cyrtopleura arcuata
  †Cyrtopleura costata
 Cythara
 †Cythara anthera
 †Cythara anthetika – type locality for species
 †Cythara asteria – type locality for species
 †Cythara gardnerae
 †Cythara harveyensis
 †Cythara klimakota – type locality for species
 †Cythara lissa – type locality for species
 †Cythara louisae
 †Cythara magnoliana – or unidentified related form
 †Cythara phrixae – type locality for species
 †Cythara pyrgota – type locality for species
 †Cythara sextoni – type locality for species
 †Cythara stypteria – type locality for species
 †Cythara teirata – type locality for species
 Cytharella
 †Cytharella barbadoides – type locality for species
 †Cytharella chariessa – type locality for species
 †Cytharella compsacosta – type locality for species
 †Cytharella cryptopleura – type locality for species
 †Cytharella galae
 †Cytharella isabellae – type locality for species
 †Cytheredeis
 †Cytheredeis ashermani
 †Cythereis
 †Cythereis americana
 †Cythereis exanthamata
 †Cythereis garretti – or unidentified related form
 †Cythereis martini
 †Cythereis rugipunctata
 †Cythereis vaughani
 Cytherella
 Cytheretta
 †Cytheretta sahnii
 †Cytheriopsis
 †Cytheriopsis alumensis
 Cytheromorpha
 †Cytheromorpha warneri
 Cytherura
 †Cytherura elongata
 †Cytherura johnsoni
 †Cytherura wardensis

D

 Daedalochila
  †Daedalochila uvulifera
 †Dallarca
 †Dallarca alomensis
 †Dallarca idarea
 †Dallarca idonea
 Dallocardia
 †Dallocardia muricata
 †Dallocardia phlyctaena
 Daphnella
 †Daphnella elata
  †Daphoenodon
 †Daphoenodon notionastes – type locality for species
  †Daphoenus – tentative report
 Dasyatis
 Dasypus
  †Dasypus bellus – type locality for species
 Dauciconus
 †Dauciconus bassi
 Deirochelys
 †Deirochelys carri
 †Deirochelys reticularia
 †Delphinodon
 †Delphinodon mento – or unidentified comparable form
 Dendraster
 Dendrocopos
 †Dendrocopos borealis
 Dendrocygna
  †Dendrogyra
 †Dendrogyra cylindrus
 Dendropoma
 †Dendropoma irregulare
 Dentalina
 †Dentalina communis
 Dentalium
 †Dentalium antillarium
 †Dentalium antillarum
 †Dentalium attenuatum
 †Dentalium callipeplum – or unidentified related form
 †Dentalium caloosaense
 †Dentalium carolinense
 †Dentalium carolinensis
 †Dentalium ceratum
 †Dentalium eboreum
 †Dentalium ladinum
 †Dentalium laqueatum
 †Dentalium pilsbryi
 †Dentalium pleiocenum
 †Dentalium santarosanum
 †Dentalium sowerbyi
 Dentimargo
 †Dentimargo aureocinctus
 †Dentimargo caloosana
 †Dentimargo dalli
 †Dentimargo eburneola
 †Dentimargo eburneolus
 †Dentimargo polyspira
 Depressiscala
 †Depressiscala nautlae
 Dermomurex
 †Dermomurex antecessor
 †Dermomurex curviductus – type locality for species
  †Dermomurex elizabethae
 †Dermomurex engonatus – type locality for species
 †Dermomurex farleyensis – type locality for species
 †Dermomurex matercula – type locality for species
 †Dermomurex sexangulus
 †Dermomurex vaughani – type locality for species
 †Desmathyus
 †Desmathyus brachydontus
 †Desmatippus
 †Desmatippus texanus
 †Desmocyon
 †Desmocyon matthewi
  Desmodus
 †Desmodus archaeodaptes – type locality for species
 †Desmodus stocki
 Desmophyllum
 †Desmophyllum willcoxi
 †Diabolocornis
 †Diabolocornis simonsi
 Diadophis
 †Diadophis elinorae – type locality for species
  †Diadophis punctatus
 Diastoma
 Dibunostoma – type locality for genus
 †Dibunostoma purii – type locality for species
  Dicathais
 †Dicathais handgenae
  †Diceratherium – or unidentified comparable form
 Dichocoenia
 †Dichocoenia caloosahatcheensis – type locality for species
 †Dichocoenia eminens – type locality for species
  †Dichocoenia stokesi
 †Dichocoenia tuberosa
 †Dictyoconus
 †Dictyoconus cookei
 Didelphis
 †Didelphis marsupialis
 †Didelphis virginiana
 †Didianema
 †Didianema duplinensis
 †Didianema orthorhytis
 †Didianema pauli
 †Didianema waltonia – type locality for species
 Didymosella
 †Didymosella crassa
 †Didymosella irregularis – type locality for species
 Dinocardium
 †Dinocardium hazeli
 †Dinocardium levyi – type locality for species
 †Dinocardium pinellasense
 †Dinocardium robustum
 †Dinocardium taphrium
  †Dinohippus
 †Dinohippus mexicanus
  †Dinohyus
 Diodon
 †Diodon circumflexus – type locality for species
 Diodora
 †Diodora alumensis
 †Diodora caloosaensis
 †Diodora carditella
 †Diodora carolinensis
  †Diodora cayenensis
 †Diodora ceryx
 †Diodora chipolana
 †Diodora corditella
 †Diodora daidala – type locality for species
 †Diodora floridana
 †Diodora meta
 †Diodora nucula
 †Diodora petasa
 †Diodora sayi
 †Dioplotherium
 †Dioplotherium manigaulti
 Diplectrum
 †Diplectrum formosum
 Diplodonta
 †Diplodonta acclinis
 †Diplodonta aclinis
 †Diplodonta alta
 †Diplodonta caloosaensis
 †Diplodonta catopotium
 †Diplodonta glos
 †Diplodonta leptodoma – type locality for species
 †Diplodonta nucleiformis
 †Diplodonta ochlockoneensis
 †Diplodonta paralta – type locality for species
 †Diplodonta puncata
 †Diplodonta punctata
 †Diplodonta radiata
 †Diplodonta semiaspera
 †Diplodonta soror
 †Diplodonta sphaeromorpha – type locality for species
 †Diplodonta subvexa
 Diploria
  †Diploria labyrinthiformis
 †Diploria sarasotana – type locality for species
 †Diplotherium
 †Diplotherium allisoni
 Diplothyra
 †Dipoides
 †Dirocerithium
 †Dirocerithium americanum
  Discinisca
 †Discinisca aldrichi – type locality for species
 †Discinisca lugubris
 †Discinisca multilineata
 †Discocyclina
 †Discocyclina flintensis
  †Discohelix
 Discoporella
 †Discoporella umbellata
 Discorbis
 †Discorbis floridana
 †Discorbis floridensis
 †Discorbis turrita
  Distorsio
 †Distorsio crassidens
 †Distorsio jungi
 †Distorsio mcgintyi – type locality for species
 †Ditremaster
 Divalinga
 †Divalinga quadrisulcata
 †Divalinga waltoniana
 Divaricella
 †Divaricella chipolana
 †Divaricella compsa
 †Divaricella dentata
 †Divaricella robertsi – type locality for species
 †Divaricella waltonia – type locality for species
 †Divaricella waltoniana
 †Divaricella waltonianum
 †Dixieus
 Dolabella
 †Dolabella aldrichi
  †Dolicholatirus
 †Dolicholatirus metae
 Donax
 †Donax aldrichi – type locality for species
 †Donax chipolanus
 †Donax fossor
 †Donax trueloides – type locality for species
 †Donax tumida
 †Donax valhosierr
  †Donax variabilis
 †Dorypaltus – type locality for genus
 †Dorypaltus prophatus
 †Dorypaltus prosphatus – type locality for species
 Dosinia
 †Dosinia acetabulum
 †Dosinia chipolana
 †Dosinia discus
 †Dosinia distans
 †Dosinia liogona
 Dosinidia
 †Dosinidia dalli – type locality for species
 †Dosinidia elegans
 Drymarchon
  †Drymarchon corais
 †Drymarchon corias
  Dryocopus
 Dumetella
 †Dumetella carolinensis
 †Durhamella
 †Durhamella oculanum
 Dyocibicides
 †Dyocibicides biserialis

E

  Echinocardium
 †Echinocardium orthonotum
 Echinocyamus
 †Echinofulgur
 †Echinofulgur echinatum
 Echinolampas
 †Echinolampas tanypetalis – type locality for species
 Echinometra
  †Echinometra lucunter
 †Ecphora
 †Ecphora bradleyae
 †Ecphora floridana
 †Ecphora pachycostata
 †Ecphora quadricostata
 †Ecphora roxanae
 †Ecphora striatula
 †Ecphora tampaensis
 †Ecphora violetae
 †Ecphora whiteoakensis
 †Ectopistes
  †Ectopistes migratorius
 †Edaphocyon
 †Edaphocyon palmeri – type locality for species
 Egretta
 †Egretta subfluvia – type locality for species
  †Egretta thula
 †Egretta tricolor – or unidentified comparable form
 Elaphe
 †Elaphe guttata
 †Elaphe obsoleta
 Eleutherodactylus – or unidentified comparable form
 †Ellipsolagena
 †Ellipsolagena bidens
 †Elliptoideus
 Ellisina
 †Ellisina laxa
  Elphidium
 †Elphidium advenum
 †Elphidium chipolensis
 †Elphidium discoidale
 †Elphidium fimbriatulum
 †Elphidium incertum
 †Elphidium latispatium
 Emarginula
 †Emarginula pilsbryi
 †Emersonius
 †Emersonius cybosyrinx – type locality for species
 Enaeta
 †Enaeta isabellae
 Encope
 †Encope abberans
 †Encope aberrans
 †Encope macrophora
 †Encope michelini
 †Encope tamiamiensis
 Endopachys
 †Endopachys tampae – type locality for species
  Engina
 †Engina floridana
 †Engoniophos
 †Engoniophos glyptus – type locality for species
 †Enhydritherium
 †Enhydritherium terraenovae – type locality for species
 †Enhydrocyon
 †Enhydrocyon pahinsintewakpa – or unidentified comparable form
 Enoplostomella
 †Enoplostomella defixa
 †Enoplostomella ligulifera
  Ensis
 †Ensis directus
 †Ensis minor
 Ensitellops
 †Ensitellops elongata
 †Ensitellops protextus
 †Ensitellops tabula
 Eontia
 †Eontia incile – or unidentified comparable form
 †Eontia platyura
 †Eontia playtyura
 †Eontia ponderosa
 †Eontia variabilis
 †Eovasum
 †Eovasum vernoni – type locality for species
  †Epicyon
 †Epicyon haydeni
 †Epicyon saevus
 †Epinephalus
 Episcynia
 †Episcynia inornata
 †Episcynia mauryi – type locality for species
 Episiphon
 †Episiphon schumoi
 Epitonium
 †Epitonium alaquaense
 †Epitonium candeanum
 †Epitonium echinaticosta
 †Epitonium fargoi
 †Epitonium foliaceicostum
 †Epitonium helikum
 †Epitonium humphreysii
 †Epitonium junceum
 †Epitonium lamellosum
 †Epitonium lineata
  †Epitonium novangliae
 †Epitonium rupicola
 †Epitonium sayanum
 †Epitonium virginiae
 Eponides
 †Eponides antillarum
 †Eponides jacksonensis
 †Eponoides
 Eptesicus
  †Eptesicus fuscus
  Equetus
 Equus
 †Equus complicatus
 †Equus fraternus
 †Equus giganteus
 †Equus leidyi
 Eratoidea
 †Eratoidea mollitor
 †Eratoidea pinellasensis
  †Eremotherium
 †Eremotherium eomigrans – type locality for species
 †Eremotherium laurillardi
 Erethizon
  †Erethizon dorsatum
 †Erethizon kleini – type locality for species
 †Erethizon poyeri – type locality for species
  Eretmochelys
 †Ereunetes
 †Ereunetes rayi – type locality for species
 Erolia
 †Erolia penepusilla – type locality for species
 Ervilia
 †Ervilia chipolana
 †Ervilia concentrata
 †Ervilia concentrica
 †Ervilia condra – type locality for species
 †Ervilia lata
 †Ervilia planata
 †Ervilia polita
 †Ervilia valhosierr – type locality for species
 Erycina
 †Erycina actinophora
 †Erycina curtidens
 †Erycina fabulina
 †Erycina indecisa
 †Erycina phaseola
 †Erycina scaptera – type locality for species
 †Erycina undosa
 Escharina
 †Escharina hyndmanni
 Escharoides
 †Escharoides erectus
  Eubalaena
 Eucidaris
  †Eucidaris tribuloides
 †Euclathurella
 †Euclathurella liveoakensis
 †Euclinostomus
 †Euclinostomus gula
 Eucrassatella
 †Eucrassatella densa
 †Eucrassatella meriodonalis
 †Eucrassatella speciosa
 †Eucymba
  †Eucyon
 †Eucyon davisi
 †Eucypraedia
 †Eucypraedia multicarinata – type locality for species
 Eudocimus
  †Eudocimus albus
 †Eudocimus leiseyi – type locality for species
 †Eudocirnus
 †Eudocirnus leiseyi
 †Eudolium
 †Eudolium subfasciatum
 Eugeniconus
 †Eugeniconus irisae
 †Eugeniconus paranobilis
 Euglandina
  †Euglandina rosea
 Eulima
 †Eulima bifasciata
 †Eulima nobilis
 Eulithidium
 †Eulithidium thalassicola
 †Euloxa – report made of unidentified related form or using admittedly obsolete nomenclature
 Eumeces
  †Eumeces fasciatus
 †Eumeces inexpectatus
 Eumops – type locality for genus
  †Eumops glaucinus – type locality for species
 †Euoplocyon
 †Euoplocyon spissidens
 Eupatagus
 †Eupatagus antillarum
 †Eupatagus clevei
 †Eupatagus mooreanus
 Euphagus
  †Euphagus cyanocephalus
 Eupleura
 †Eupleura caloosa
 †Eupleura calusa
 †Eupleura caudata
 †Eupleura intermedia
 †Eupleura miocenica
 †Eupleura pterina – type locality for species
 †Eupleura sulcidentata
 †Eupleura tampaensis
 †Eurhodia
 †Eurhodia patelliformis
 Eurypyrene
 †Eurypyrene miccosukee
 Eurytellina
 †Eurytellina alternata
 †Eurytellina lineata
 †Eurytellina nitens
 †Eurytellina pressa
 †Eurytellina roburina
 †Eurytellina strictolineata
 †Eurytellina tayloriana
  Eusmilia
 †Eusmilia fastigiata
 Euspira
 †Euspira caudata
 †Euspira hemicryptus
 †Euspira rotunda – type locality for species
 Euvola
 †Euvola bowdenensis – or unidentified related form
 †Euvola hemicyclicus
 †Euvola ochlockoneensis
  †Euvola raveneli
 †Euvola smithi
 †Euvola ziczac
 †Exputens
 †Exputens ocalensis

F

 Fabella
 †Fabella dalli
 †Fabella navicula
 Falco
  †Falco columbarius
 †Falco peregrinus
 †Falco readi – type locality for species
 †Falco sparverius
 Falsifusus
 †Falsilyria
 †Falsilyria citrusensis
 †Falsilyria eocenia
 †Falsilyria kendrewi
 †Falsilyria mansfieldi
 Farancia
  †Farancia abacura
 Fasciolaria
 †Fasciolaria apicina
 †Fasciolaria calusa
 †Fasciolaria evergladensis
 †Fasciolaria monocingulata
 †Fasciolaria okeechobeensis
 †Fasciolaria petrosa
 †Fasciolaria ramondi
 †Fasciolaria rhomboidea
 †Fasciolaria scalarina
 †Fasciolaria seminole
  †Fasciolaria tulipa
 Favartia
 †Favartia cellulosa
 Favia
 †Favia fragum
  Favites
 †Favites yborensis – type locality for species
  Felis
 †Felis rexroadensis
 Fenimorea
 †Fenimorea fucata
 †Fenimorea moseri
 †Fenimorea pagodula
 Ferrissia
 †Ferrissia hendersoni
 Fibularia
 †Fibularia vaughani
  Ficus
 †Ficus communis
 †Ficus eopapyratia – type locality for species
 †Ficus floridensis
 †Ficus holmesi
 †Ficus jacksonensis
 †Ficus mississippiensis
 †Ficus papyratium – or unidentified related form
 Figularia
 †Figularia crassicostulata
 Fimbria
 †Fimbria olssoni – type locality for species
 †Fimbria vernoni – type locality for species
 Finella
 †Finella adamsi
 †Finella dubia
  Fissurella
 Flabellum
 †Flabellum chipolanum – type locality for species
 †Flabellum dubium
 †Flabellum exaratum
 †Flabellum moseleyi
 †Floradusta
 †Floradusta alumensis – type locality for species
 †Florida
  †Florida caerulea
 †Floridaceras
 †Floridaceras whitei
 †Floridachoerus
 †Floridachoerus olseni – type locality for species
 †Floridameryx – type locality for genus
 †Floridameryx floridanus – type locality for species
 †Floridaophis – type locality for genus
 †Floridaophis auffenbergi – type locality for species
 †Floridatragulus
 †Floridatragulus dolichanthereus – type locality for species
 †Floridemys – type locality for genus
 †Floridemys nanus – type locality for species
 Floridina
 †Floridina antiqua
 †Floridina bifoliata
 †Florimetis
 †Florimetis biplicata
 †Florimetis chipolana
 †Florimetis magnoliana
 Fontigens – report made of unidentified related form or using admittedly obsolete nomenclature
 Fossaria
 †Fossaria cubensis
 Fossarus
 †Fossarus anomala
 †Fossarus chipolanus
 †Fossarus florius – type locality for species
  Fragum
 †Fragum apateticum
 †Fragum sellardsi – type locality for species
 Fugleria
 †Fugleria tenera
 †Fulguopsis
 †Fulguopsis plagosus
 Fulgurofusus
 †Fulgurofusus evergladensis
 †Fulgurofusus spiratum
  Fulguropsis
 †Fulguropsis feldmanni
 †Fulica
  †Fulica americana
 †Fulica minor
  †Fundulus
 Fusimitra
 †Fusimitra conquista
  Fusinus
 †Fusinus ballista
 †Fusinus capeletti
 †Fusinus dianeae
 †Fusinus exilis
 †Fusinus waltonensis – type locality for species
 †Fusinus watermani
 Fusiturricula
 †Fusiturricula condominia
 †Fusiturricula glaphura – type locality for species
 †Fusiturricula lapenotierei
 †Fusiturricula paraservata – type locality for species
 †Fusiturricula servata – or unidentified related form

G

 Gadila
 †Gadila clarae
 †Gadila spiniformis
 †Gadila volvulus – type locality for species
 Gadilopsis
 †Gadilopsis spiniformis – type locality for species
 †Gagaria
 †Gagaria mossomi
  †Galaxea
 †Galaxea excelsa – type locality for species
 Galeocerdo
 †Galeocerdo aduncus
 †Galeocerdo contortis
 †Galeocerdo contortus
  †Galeocerdo cuvier
 †Galeocerdo cuvieri
 †Galeocerdo mayumbensis
 Gallinago
  †Gallinago gallinago
 Gallinula
 †Gallinula brodkorbi – type locality for species
 †Gallinula chloropus
 †Gambusia
  †Gambusia affinis
 Gari
 †Gari bowdichi – type locality for species
 †Gari jacksonense
 †Gari jacksonensis
  Gastrochaena
 †Gastrochaena cuneiformis
 †Gastrochaena dodona – type locality for species
 †Gastrochaena emilyana – type locality for species
 †Gastrochaena hians
 †Gastrochaena ligua
 †Gastrochaena rostrata
 †Gastrochaena rotunda
 Gastrocopta
 †Gastrocopta contracta
 †Gastrocopta pentodon
 †Gastrocopta rupicola
 Gastrophryne
  †Gastrophryne carolinensis
 Gaudryina
 †Gaudryina atlantica
 Gavia
 †Gavia concinna
 †Gavia immer
 †Gavia pacifica
  †Gavialosuchus – type locality for genus
 †Gavialosuchus americana – type locality for species
 †Gavialosuchus americanus
 Gegania
 †Gegania acutissima
 †Gelasinostoma
 †Gelasinostoma chipolanum
 †Gelasinostoma elegantula
 Gemma
 †Gemma gemma
 †Gemma magna
 †Gemma triquetra
  Gemmula
 †Gemmula machapoorensis
 †Gemmula vaningeni – type locality for species
 Gemophos
 †Gemophos maxwelli
 †Gemophos tinctus
 Genota
 †Genota floridana – type locality for species
 †Gentilicamelus – or unidentified comparable form
  Geochelone
 †Geochelone mlynarskii – type locality for species
 †Geochelone tedwhitei – type locality for species
 Geomys
 †Geomys floridanus
 †Geomys pinetis
 †Geothlypis
 †Geothlypis trichas
 †Gephrotes
 †Gephrotes quadriserialis
 Gephyrotes
 †Gephyrotes quadriserialis
  Geranoaetus
 †Geringophis
 †Geringophis robustus – type locality for species
  Gibberula
 †Gibberula chondra – type locality for species
 †Gibberula dryados
 †Gibberula floridana
 †Gibberula waltoniana – type locality for species
 Gibbolucina
 †Gibbolucina ocalana
 †Gibbolucina scolaroi – type locality for species
 †Gibbolucina xustris – type locality for species
  †Gigantopecten
 †Gigantopecten pittieri
 Gigantopora
 †Gigantopora cyclops
 †Gigantostrea
 †Gigantostrea trigonalis
 Ginglymostoma
 †Ginglymostoma cirratum
 †Gisortia
 †Gisortia harrisi
 †Glabrocythara
 †Glabrocythara locklini
 Glans
 †Glans scabricostata
 Glaucidium
 †Glaucidium explorator
  Glaucomys
 †Globecphora
 †Globecphora floridana
 Globicephala
  †Globicephala macrorhynchus – type locality for species
 Globigerina
 †Globinassa
 †Globinassa floridana
 †Globinassa roseae
 †Globinassa schizopyga
 Globivenus
 †Globivenus rugatina
 Globorotalia
 †Globorotalia crystalriverensis
  Globularia
 †Globularia fischeri
 †Globularia solidula
 †Globularia streptostoma
 Globulina
 †Globulina gibba
 †Globulina inaequalis
  †Glossotherium
 †Glossotherium chapadmalense
 †Glossotherium garbanii
  Glycymeris
 †Glycymeris americana
 †Glycymeris decussata
 †Glycymeris gadsdenensis
 †Glycymeris hillsboroughensis – tentative report
 †Glycymeris lisbonensis
 †Glycymeris suwannensis
 †Glycymeris tuckerae – tentative report
 †Glycymeris waltonense
  Glyphostoma
 †Glyphostoma aldrichi
 †Glyphostoma belonoides – type locality for species
 †Glyphostoma celosia
 †Glyphostoma chipolanum – type locality for species
 †Glyphostoma harrisi – type locality for species
 †Glyphostoma ischnon – type locality for species
 †Glyphostoma marionae
 †Glyphostoma nannophues – type locality for species
 †Glyphostoma perieilema
 †Glyphostoma polysculptum
 †Glyphostoma sapita
 †Glyphostoma scoptes
 †Glyphostoma tiarophoron – type locality for species
 †Glyphostoma tryphonoides
 †Glyphostoma typhon
 †Glyphostoma watsoni
 †Glyphostoma woodringi
 †Glyphostoma xeston – type locality for species
 Glyphostomops
 †Glyphostomops pinellasensis
 Glyphyalinia
 †Glyphyalinia indentata
 †Glyptanatica
 †Glyptanatica caractica
 †Glyptanatica euglypta – type locality for species
 Glyptoactis
 †Glyptoactis hadra
 †Glyptoactis himerta
 †Glyptoactis serricosta
  †Glyptotherium
 †Glyptotherium arizonae
 †Glyptotherium floridanum – type locality for species
  †Gomphotherium
 †Gomphotherium obscurum – or unidentified comparable form
 †Gomphotherium simplicidens
 †Goneavus
 †Goniodelphis – type locality for genus
 †Goniodelphis hudsoni – type locality for species
  Goniopora
 †Goniopora aucillana – type locality for species
 †Goniopora ballistensis – type locality for species
 †Goniopora calhounensis – type locality for species
 †Goniopora decaturensis – or unidentified comparable form
 †Goniopora jacobiana
 †Goniopora matsoni – type locality for species
 †Goniopora tampaensis – type locality for species
 Gopherus
  †Gopherus polyphemus
 Gouldia
 †Gouldia alta
 †Gouldia cerina
 †Gouldia costaricensis – type locality for species
 †Gouldia erosum
 †Gouldia floridana
 †Gouldia metastriata
 †Gouldia metastriatum
 †Gouldia phacota
 †Granoturris
 †Granoturris padolina
 Granulina
 †Granulina defuniak
 †Granulina ovuliformis
 Graptemys
  †Graptemys barbouri – or unidentified comparable form
 Gregariella
 †Gregariella coralliophaga
 Grus
  †Grus americana
 †Grus canadensis
 †Guara
 †Guara alba
 Guttulina
 †Guttulina caudata
 †Guttulina lactea
 Gymnogyps
  †Gymnogyps californianus
 †Gymnogyps californicus
 †Gymnogyps kofordi – type locality for species
 Gypsina
 †Gypsina globula
 Gyraulus
 †Gyraulus parvus

H

 †Hadrodelphis
 Haematopus – type locality for genus
 †Haematopus palliatus – type locality for species
 Haemulon
 Haliaeetus
 †Haliaeetus leucocephalus
 †Haliaetus
 †Haliaetus leucocephalus
  †Halichoeres
  †Halimeda
 Halodule
 Haminoea
 †Haminoea pompholyx
 †Haminoea sulcobasis
 Hanetia
 †Hanetia mengeana
 †Hanetia vaughani
 Haplocytheridea
 †Haplocytheridea bassleri
 Harengula
 †Harrymys
 †Harrymys magnus
  Hastula
 †Hastula cinerea
 Haustellum
 †Haustellum gilli
 †Haustellum messorium
 †Haustellum rubidum
 Hawaiia
 †Hawaiia minuscule
 Hebetoncylus
 †Hebetoncylus excentricus
 Heilprinia
 †Heilprinia caloosaensis
 †Heilprinia carolinensis
 †Heilprinia dalli
 †Heilprinia gunteri
 †Heilprinia hasta
 Heliaster
  †Heliaster microbrachius
 Helicina
 †Helicina ballista
 †Helicina posti
 †Heliscomys
 Helisoma
 †Helisoma conanta
 †Helisoma conanti
 †Helisoma disstoni
 †Helisoma scalare
  Heloderma – tentative report
 †Helonetta – type locality for genus
 †Helonetta brodkorbi – type locality for species
  †Hemiauchenia
 †Hemiauchenia gracilis – type locality for species
 †Hemiauchenia macrocephala
 †Hemiauchenia minima
 Hemicerithium
 †Hemicerithium akriton – type locality for species
 †Hemicerithium cossmanni
 †Hemicerithium craticulum – type locality for species
 †Hemicerithium pagodum – type locality for species
 Hemicythere
 Hemimactra
 †Hemimactra craspeota
 †Hemimactra densa
 †Hemimactra dodona
 †Hemimactra solidissima
 †Hemimactra solidissina
 †Hemimactra solidssima
 †Hemimactra subparilis
 Hemimetis
 †Hemimetis magnoliana
  Hemipristis
  †Hemipristis serra
 †Hemipristis wyattdurhami – or unidentified comparable form
 Here
 †Here densatus
 †Here glenni
 †Here wacissana – or unidentified comparable form
 †Herodias
 †Herodias egretta
   †Herpetotherium
 Hespererato
 †Hespererato chipolana – type locality for species
 †Hespererato maugeriae
 †Hesperisterinia
 †Hesperisterinia filicata
 Hesperisternia
 †Hesperisternia chipolana – type locality for species
 †Hesperisternia miamiensis
 †Hesperisternia multangulus
 †Hesperisternia waltonia – type locality for species
 †Hesperisternia waltonianum
 †Hesperotestudo
 †Hesperotestudo alleni – type locality for species
 †Hesperotestudo crassicutata
 †Hesperotestudo crassiscutata
 †Hesperotestudo incisa
 †Hesperotestudo mlynarsii
 †Hesperotestudo mlynarskii
 †Hesperotestudo turgida – or unidentified comparable form
  Heterodon
 †Heterodon brevis – type locality for species
 †Heterodon platyrhinos
  †Heterodon simus
 Heterostegina
 †Heterostegina ocalana
 †Hexameryx – type locality for genus
 †Hexameryx simpsoni – type locality for species
 Hexaplex
  †Hexaplex fulvescens
 †Hexaplex hertweckorum
 †Hexaplex jameshoubricki
 †Hexaplex trippae
 †Hexaplex veatchi – type locality for species
 Hiatella
 †Hiatella arctica
  Himantopus
 Himerometra
 †Himerometra bassleri
 Hincksina
 †Hincksina bilaminaria – type locality for species
 †Hincksina ocalensis
 Hindsia
 †Hindsia pyta
 Hindsiclava
 †Hindsiclava antealesidota
 †Hindsiclava calligonoides – type locality for species
 †Hindsiclava eupora
 †Hindsiclava perspirata
 †Hindsiella
 †Hindsiella nephritica
  †Hipparion
 †Hipparion tehonense – or unidentified comparable form
  Hipponix
 †Hipponix ceras
 †Hipponix floridana
 †Hipponix floridanus – type locality for species
 †Hipponix levinus
 †Hipponix tampensis
 †Hipponix willcoxii
 Hippopleurifera
 †Hippopleurifera costulata
 †Hippopleurifera crassicollis
 †Hippopleurifera incondita
 †Hippopleurifera ligulata
 †Hippopleurifera moodysbranchensis
 †Hippopleurifera punctata
 †Hippopleurifera radicata
 Hippopodina
 †Hippopodina vibraculifera
 Hippoporidra
 †Hippoporidra calcarea
 Hippoporina
 †Hippoporina lucens
  †Hippotherium
  †Holmesina
 †Holmesina floridanus
 †Holmesina septentrionalis
 †Homiphoca
 †Homiphoca capensis
 Homo
  †Homo sapiens
 †Homotherium
 †Homotherium serum
 †Hoplictis
 Hulingsina
 †Hulingsina ashermani
 †Humboldtiana – tentative report
 †Humboldtiana tuckerae
  Hyalina
 †Hyalina brithia – type locality for species
 †Hyalina chipolana
 †Hyalina coloba
 †Hyalina critha – type locality for species
 †Hyalina denticulatoides
 †Hyalina elegantula
 †Hyalina euancycla – type locality for species
 †Hyalina eurystoma – type locality for species
 †Hyalina impagina
 †Hyalina nanna – type locality for species
 †Hyalina newmani
 †Hyalina silicicifluvia
 †Hyalina vadosa – type locality for species
 †Hyalina xanthophaes – type locality for species
 †Hyalinonetrion
 †Hyalinonetrion clavatum
 †Hyalopyrgus
 †Hyalopyrgus aequicostatus
 †Hydranassa
 †Hydranassa tricolor
 Hydrobia – report made of unidentified related form or using admittedly obsolete nomenclature
  Hydrochoerus
 †Hydrochoerus pinckneyi – or unidentified comparable form
 Hyla
 †Hyla baderi – type locality for species
 †Hyla cinerea
 †Hyla femoralis
 †Hyla goini – type locality for species
 †Hyla gratiosa
 Hylocichla – or unidentified comparable form
 †Hylocichla mustelina
 Hyotissa
 †Hyotissa haitensis – type locality for species
 †Hyotissa meridionalis
  †Hypohippus
 †Hypohippus affinis – or unidentified comparable form
 †Hypohippus chico
  †Hypolagus
 †Hypolagus ringoldensis
 †Hypolagus tedfordi – or unidentified comparable form
 Hysteroconcha
 †Hysteroconcha cypta
 †Hysteroconcha harrisi

I

 Ictalurus
  †Ictalurus catus – or unidentified comparable form
 Ilex
 †Ilex glabra
 Ilyanassa
 †Ilyanassa arata
 †Ilyanassa corbis
 †Ilyanassa floridana
 †Ilyanassa granifera
 †Ilyanassa marthae
 †Ilyanassa palmbeachensis
 †Ilyanassa scalaspira
 †Ilyanassa wilmingtonensis
  †Indarctos
 †Inodrillia
 †Inodrillia aepynota
 Ischnochiton
 Iselica
 †Iselica myttonis
 †Iselica psila – type locality for species
 Isognomon
 †Isognomon alatus
 †Isognomon radiatus – tentative report
 Isophyllia
 †Isophyllia desotoensis – type locality for species
 †Isophyllia sinuosa
 Isurus
 †Isurus desori
  †Isurus oxyrinchus
 Ithycythara
 †Ithycythara defuniak – type locality for species
 †Ithycythara emeryi
 †Ithycythara lanceolata
 †Ithycythara maera
 †Ithycythara psila
 †Ithycythara radinos – type locality for species
 †Ithycythara tarri
 Ixobrychus
  †Ixobrychus exilis

J

  Jabiru
 †Jabiru mycteria – type locality for species
 Jacana
 †Jacana farrandi – type locality for species
 †Jacana spinosa
 Japonactaeon
 †Japonactaeon punctostriata
 †Japonactaeon punctostriatus
 †Japsidiconus
 †Japsidiconus wilsoni
 Jaspidella
 †Jaspidella cofacorys – type locality for species
 †Jaspidella colleta
 †Jaspidella jaspidea – tentative report
 †Jenkinsia – or unidentified comparable form
 Jenneria
 †Jenneria hepleri
 †Jenneria loxahatchiensis
 †Jenneria richardsi
 †Jenneria violetae
 †Jimomys – or unidentified related form
 †Jordanella
  †Jordanella floridae
 Julia
 †Julia floridana
 Juliacorbula
 †Juliacorbula scutata
 Junco
  †Junco hyemalis

K

 Kalolophus
 †Kalolophus chipolanus
 †Karstala – type locality for genus
 †Karstala silva – type locality for species
 †Kathpalmeria
 †Kathpalmeria georgiana
 Kinosternon
  †Kinosternon subrubrum
 †Kionaster
 †Kionaster petersonae – type locality for species
 Knefastia
 †Knefastia brooksvillensis
 †Knefastia glypta – type locality for species
 †Knefastia lindae
 †Knefastia waltonia – type locality for species
 †Kogiopsis – type locality for genus
 †Kogiopsis floridana – type locality for species
 †Koopmanycteris – type locality for genus
 †Koopmanycteris palaeomormoops – type locality for species
  Kuphus
 †Kuphus incrassatus
 Kurtziella
  †Kurtziella cerina
 †Kurtziella daidalea – type locality for species
 †Kurtziella limonitella
 †Kurtziella limontella
 †Kurtziella prionota – type locality for species
 †Kurtziella ramondi
 †Kurtziella serta
 †Kurtziella stephanophora – type locality for species
 †Kurtziella thektapleura – type locality for species
 †Kurtziella websteri
 †Kyptoceras
 †Kyptoceras amatorum

L

 †Lachnolaimus
  †Lachnolaimus maximus
 Laciolina
 †Laciolina magna
 †Lactophrys
 Laevapex
 †Laevapex peninsulae
 †Laevella – type locality for genus
 †Laevella floridana – type locality for species
 Laevicardium
 †Laevicardium compressum
 †Laevicardium mortoni
 †Laevicardium serratum
 Laganum
 †Laganum floridanum
 †Laganum ocalanum
 Lagena
 †Lagena hexagona
 †Lagena laevis
 †Lagena substriata
 †Lagodon
  †Lagodon rhomboides
 †Laguna
 †Laguna floridanum
 Lamarckina
 †Lamarckina atlantica
  Lampropeltis
 †Lampropeltis getulus
 Lamychaena
 †Lamychaena hians
 Lanius
 †Lanius ludovicianus
 †Lantanotherium
 †Lapparia
 †Lapparia conradi – type locality for species
  Larus
 †Larus elmorei – type locality for species
 †Larus elmori
 †Larus lacus – type locality for species
 †Larus perpetuus – type locality for species
  Lasiurus
 †Lasiurus borealis
 †Lasiurus intermedius
 †Latecphora
 †Latecphora bradleyae
 †Latecphora violetae
 Laterallus
  †Laterallus exilis – or unidentified comparable form
 †Laterallus guti
 Latirus
 †Latirus angulata
 †Latirus brevicaudatus
 †Latirus callimorphus
 †Latirus duerri
 †Latirus floridanus
 †Latirus hypsipettus
 †Latirus jucundus
 †Latirus maxwelli
 †Latirus miamiensis
 †Latirus multilineatus
 †Latirus rugatus
 †Latirus seminolensis
 †Leidymys
 Leiocephalus – tentative report
 Leiostomus
  †Leiostomus xanthurus
 †Leitneria
 †Leitneria floridana
 Lemintina
 †Lemintina granifera
 †Lemintina granifora
 †Lemintina mcgintyi
 Leopardus
  †Leopardus pardalis
  †Leopardus wiedii
 †Lepicythara
 †Lepicythara basilissa – type locality for species
 †Lepicythara turrita
  Lepidochelys
 †Lepidocyclina
 †Lepidocyclina ocalana
 Lepisosteus
 †Lepisosteus platystomus
 Lepomis
 †Lepomis gulosus – or unidentified comparable form
 †Lepomis microlophus
 †Leptarctus
 †Leptarctus ancipidens
 †Leptarctus webbi – type locality for species
  †Leptocyon – tentative report
 †Leptomactra
 †Leptomactra delumbis
 †Leptomactra valhosierr – type locality for species
 Leptopecten
 †Leptopecten irremotis
 †Leptopecten leonensis
 Leptoseris
 †Leptoseris cucullata
 Lepus
  †Lepus townsendii – or unidentified comparable form
 †Leucophoyx
 †Leucophoyx thula
 Lichenopora
 Lima
 †Lima caribaea
 †Lima caribbaea
 †Lima halensis
 †Lima vicksburgiana
  Limaria
 †Limaria carolinensis
 †Limaria chipolana
 †Limaria pellucida
 Limatula
 †Limatula subauriculata
 Limea
 †Limea bronniana
 Limnodromus
  †Limnodromus scolopaceus
 †Limnoecus
 †Limosa
 Linatella
  †Linatella caudata
 Lindapecten
 †Lindapecten acanikos – type locality for species
 †Lindapecten chipolanus
 †Lindapecten harrisi
 †Lindapecten muscosus
 †Lindoliva
 †Lindoliva diegelae
 Linga
 †Linga densatus
 †Linga gelnni
 †Linga waccamawensis
 †Liochlamys
 †Liochlamys bulbosa
 †Liochlamys griffini
 Lioglyphostoma
 †Lioglyphostoma rusum – type locality for species
 †Lioglyphostoma solia
 †Lioglyphostoma tyro – type locality for species
  Liotia
 †Liotia agenea
 †Liotia coronata
 †Liotia solariella
 †Liquidambar
 †Lirodiscus
 †Lirodiscus jacksonensis
 Lirophora
 †Lirophora burnsii
 †Lirophora ceramota – type locality for species
 †Lirophora crossata
 †Lirophora crossota
 †Lirophora cumaina
 †Lirophora cymaina
 †Lirophora funiakensis – type locality for species
 †Lirophora glyptocyma
 †Lirophora latilirata
 †Lirophora sellardsi – type locality for species
 †Lirophora trimeris – type locality for species
 †Lirophora ulocyma
 †Lirophora xesta
  Lithophaga
 †Lithophaga antillarum
 †Lithophaga aristata – tentative report
 †Lithophaga bisulcata
 †Lithophaga dalli
 †Lithophaga nigra
 †Lithophaga oryzoides – type locality for species
 Lithophyllum
 †Lithophyllum compactum
 †Lithophyllum zonatum
 †Lithophysema
 Lithopoma
  †Lithopoma americanum
 †Lithopoma lindae
 †Lithopoma precursor
 †Lithopoma scolopax
 †Lithopoma tectariaeformis
 Lithothamnion
 Litiopa
 †Litiopa palaeosargassina
 Littoraria
  †Littoraria angulifera
 †Littoraria caloosahatcheensis
 †Littoraria irrorata
 †Littoraria lindae
 †Littoraria seminole
 †Littoraria sheaferi
 Littorina
 †Littorina sheaferi
 †Lituonella
 Lobatus
 †Lobatus costatus
 †Lobatus gigas
 †Lobatus raninus
 †Lobatus williamsi
 Longchaeus
 †Longchaeus suturalis
 Lontra
  †Lontra canadensis
 Lophelia
 †Lophelia brachycephala – or unidentified comparable form
 †Lophelia gracilis – or unidentified comparable form
 †Lophelia prolifera
 †Lophocetus – or unidentified related form
 Lophodytes
  †Lophodytes cucullatus
 †Lophoranina
 †Lophoranina georgiana
 Lottia
 †Lottia actina
 Lovenia
 †Lovenia clarki
 Loxacypraea
 †Loxacypraea apalachicolae – type locality for species
 †Loxacypraea chilona – type locality for species
 †Loxacypraea emilyae – type locality for species
 Loxoconcha
 †Loxoconcha doryandae
 †Loxoconcha reticularis
 Lucapina
  †Lucapina sowerbii
 †Lucapina suffusa
 †Lucapina talanteia
 Lucapinella
 †Lucapinella limatula
 Lucina
 †Lucina corpulenta
 †Lucina pensylvanica
 Lucinisca
 †Lucinisca calhounensis
 †Lucinisca cribarius
 †Lucinisca cribrarius
 †Lucinisca nassula
 †Lucinisca plesiolophus
 †Lucinisca silicatus
 Lucinoma
 †Lucinoma contractus
 †Lucinoma crenulata
  Luidia
 Lunulites
 †Lunulites distans
 Luria
 †Luria campbelliana
 †Luria dominicensis
 †Luria mariaelisabethae – type locality for species
 †Luria voleki
  †Lutjanus
 Lynx
  †Lynx rufus
 Lyria
 †Lyria citrusensis – type locality for species
 †Lyria heilprini
 †Lyria mississippiensis – tentative report
 †Lyria musicina
 †Lyria pycnopleura – type locality for species
 †Lyropecten
 †Lyropecten burnetti
 †Lyropecten jeffersonensis
 †Lyropecten marionensis
 †Lyropecten nicholsi
 †Lyropecten tamiamiensis – type locality for species
 Lytechinus
  †Lytechinus variegatus

M

 †Machaeromeryx
 †Machaeromeryx gilchristensis – type locality for species
  †Machairodus
 Macoma
 †Macoma brevifrons
 †Macoma constricta
 †Macoma irma
 †Macoma paralenis – type locality for species
 †Macoma pseudomera – or unidentified comparable form
  †Macoma tenta
 †Macoma virginiana
 †Macoma virginicana
 Macrocallista
 †Macrocallista acuminata
 †Macrocallista annexa
  †Macrocallista maculata
 †Macrocallista nimbosa
 †Macrocallista reposta
 †Macrocallista waltonensis
 Macrochelys
 †Macrochelys auffenbergi – type locality for species
  †Macrochelys temminckii
 Macrocypraea
  †Macrocypraea cervus
 †Macrocypraea joanneae
 †Macrocypraea spengleri
 Macropneustes
 Mactra
 †Mactra chipolana
 †Mactrocallista
 Mactrotoma
 †Mactrotoma cymata
 †Mactrotoma fragilis
 †Mactrotoma fragilus
 †Mactrotoma undula
 Madracis
 †Madracis decactis
 †Madracis decaseptata – type locality for species
 Madrepora
 †Madrepora oculata
 Magilus
 †Magilus streami
 Magnolia
  †Magnolia virginiana
 Malaclemys
 †Malaclemys terrapin
 Malea
 †Malea springi
 †Mammacyon
 †Mammacyon obtusidens – or unidentified comparable form
 †Mammut
  †Mammut americanum
 †Mammut matthewi
 †Mammuthus
  †Mammuthus columbi – type locality for species
 †Mammuthus hayi
  Manicina
 †Manicina areolata
 †Manicina pliocenica
 †Manicina puntagordensis
 Maoricrypta
 †Maoricrypta costata
 Marevalvata
 †Marevalvata tricarinata
  Margaretta
 †Margaretta congesta – type locality for species
 †Margaretta fallax
 †Margaretta nodifera
 †Margaretta vicksburgica
 †Margaritaria
 †Margaritaria abrupta
 Margarites
 †Margarites tampaensis
  Marginella
 †Marginella amiantula
 †Marginella ballista
 †Marginella bella
 †Marginella bellula
 †Marginella caloosana
 †Marginella clenchi – or unidentified comparable form
 †Marginella contracta – or unidentified related form
 †Marginella denticulata
 †Marginella faunula
 †Marginella gravida – or unidentified comparable form
 †Marginella gregaria
 †Marginella hartleyanum
 †Marginella inepta
 †Marginella infecta
 †Marginella mansfieldi
 †Marginella minuta
 †Marginella pardalis
 †Marginella posti
 Marshallora
 †Marshallora nigrocincta
 Marsupina
  †Marsupina bufo
 Martesia
 †Martesia striata
 †Marvacrassatella
 †Marvacrassatella meridianalis
 †Marvacrassatella meridionalis
  Massyla
 †Massyla distinguenda
 †Massyla propevenusta
 †Massyla runchaena – type locality for species
 †Massyla shirleyae
 †Massyla venusta
 Masticophis
 †Masticophis flagellum
 †Mazzalina – report made of unidentified related form or using admittedly obsolete nomenclature
 †Mazzalina costata
 †Mclelannia
 †Mclelannia aenigma
 Meandrina
 †Meandrina alveolus
 †Meandrina barretti
 †Meandrina costatus
 †Meandrina meandrites
 †Meandrina meandrities
 †Meandrina variabilis
 Megabalanus
 †Megabalanus tintinnabulum
 Megacardita
 †Megacardita hesperide
 Megaceryle
 †Megaceryle alcyon
  †Megahippus
 †Megalagus
 †Megalagus abaconis – type locality for species
 †Megalictis
 †Megalictis frazieri
 †Megalonx
 †Megalonx wheatleyi – or unidentified comparable form
  †Megalonyx
 †Megalonyx jeffersonii
  †Megalonyx leptostomus
 †Megalonyx wheatleyi
 Megalops
 †Megalops atlantica – or unidentified comparable form
 †Megalops atlanticus
  †Megantereon
 †Megantereon hesperus
 Megaptera
 Meioceras
 †Meioceras nitidum
 Melampus
 †Melampus bidentatus
 †Melampus coffea
 †Melampus monile
 Melanella
 †Melanella bartschi
 †Melanella calkinsi
 †Melanella conoidea
 †Melanella jamaicensis
 †Melanella locklini
 †Melanella magnoliana
 Melanerpes
 †Melanerpes carolinus
  †Melanerpes erythrocephalus
 Meleagris
 †Meleagris anza
  †Meleagris gallopavo – type locality for species
 †Meleagris tridens – type locality for species
 Mellita
 †Mellita aclinensis
 †Mellita quinquiesperforata
 Melongena
 †Melongena aspinosa
 †Melongena bispinosa
 †Melongena caloosahatcheensis
 †Melongena cannoni
 †Melongena chickee
 †Melongena consors
 †Melongena corona
 †Melongena crassicornuta
 †Melongena cynthiae
 †Melongena diegelae
 †Melongena draperi
 †Melongena holeylandica
 †Melongena lindae
  †Melongena melongena
 †Melongena sarasotaensis
 †Melongena sculpturata
 †Melongena taurus
 †Melongena turricula
 Melospiza
  †Melospiza georgiana
 †Melospiza melodia
 Membranipora – or unidentified comparable form
 Membraniporella
 †Membraniporella compressa
 Membraniporidra
 †Membraniporidra spissimuralis
 †Memraniporidra
 †Memraniporidra similis
  †Menoceras
 †Menoceras arikarense
 †Menoceras barbouri
 Menticirrhus
 Mephitis
 †Mephitis elongata
 †Mephitis mephitis
 Mercenaria
 †Mercenaria campechiensis
 †Mercenaria carolinensis
 †Mercenaria corrugata
 †Mercenaria langdoni
  †Mercenaria mercenaria
 †Mercenaria nannodes – type locality for species
 †Mercenaria ochlockoneensis
 †Mercenaria permagna
 †Mercenaria prodona
 †Mercenaria prodroma – type locality for species
 Meretrix
 †Meretrix floridana
 †Meretrix imitabilis – or unidentified related form
 †Meretrix waltonensis – type locality for species
 Mergus
 †Mergus merganser
 †Mergus serrator
 Merisca
 †Merisca aequistriata
 †Merisca halidona
 †Merisca merula
  †Merychippus
 †Merychippus brevidontus – or unidentified comparable form
 †Merychippus californicus – or unidentified comparable form
 †Merychippus gunteri – type locality for species
 †Merychippus primus
  †Merycoidodon
 Mesoplodon
 †Mesoplodon longirostris
  †Mesoreodon
 †Mesoreodon floridensis – type locality for species
 †Metatomarctus
 †Metatomarctus canavus
  †Metaxytherium – type locality for genus
 †Metaxytherium albifontanum – type locality for species
 †Metaxytherium crataegense – type locality for species
 †Metaxytherium floridanum – type locality for species
 †Metracolposa
 †Metracolposa incrustans – type locality for species
 †Metradolium
 †Metradolium parvirimulatum
 †Metradolium transversum
 Metula
 †Metula roberti
 †Microcerion
 †Microcerion floridanum
 †Microcythara
 †Microcythara caloosahatcheensis
 Microdrillia
 †Microdrillia hebetika – type locality for species
  Microhyla
 Micromenetus
 †Micromenetus alabamensis
 †Micromenetus diatatus
 †Micromenetus dilatatus
 Micropogonias
 Micropora
 †Micropora coriacea
  Micropterus
 †Micropterus salmoides
 Microtus
 †Microtus australis
 †Microtus hibbardi
 †Microtus pennsylvanicus
 †Microtus pinetorum
 Micrurus
  †Micrurus fulvius
 Millepora
  †Millepora alcicornis
 Miltha
 †Miltha caloosaensis
 †Miltha carmenae – type locality for species
 †Miltha chipolana
 †Miltha chipolanus
 †Miltha hillsboroensis
 Milvago
 †Milvago chimachima
 †Mimus
  †Mimus polyglottos
 †Miogypsina
 †Miogypsina globulina
  †Miohippus
 †Miomyotis – type locality for genus
 †Miomyotis floridanus – type locality for species
 †Miopetaurista
 †Miopetaurista webbi – type locality for species
 †Miospermophilus – or unidentified comparable form
  †Miracinonyx
 †Miracinonyx inexpectatus
 Mitra
 †Mitra acteoglypha – type locality for species
 †Mitra carolinensis
 †Mitra desmia – type locality for species
 †Mitra heilprini
 †Mitra heilpriri
 †Mitra hosfordensis
 †Mitra lindae
 †Mitra lineolata
 †Mitra mitrodita – type locality for species
 †Mitra prodroma – type locality for species
 †Mitra semiferruginea
 †Mitra silicata
 †Mitra stephensoni
 Mitrella
 †Mitrella acanthodes
 †Mitrella alumen – type locality for species
 †Mitrella asema – type locality for species
 †Mitrella belonis – type locality for species
 †Mitrella blastos – type locality for species
 †Mitrella dalli
 †Mitrella dallina – type locality for species
 †Mitrella dicaria
 †Mitrella eluthera
 †Mitrella gardnerae
 †Mitrella hayesorum – type locality for species
 †Mitrella ischna – type locality for species
 †Mitrella juncea – type locality for species
 †Mitrella mikra – type locality for species
 †Mitrella nanna – type locality for species
 †Mitrella oryzoides – type locality for species
 †Mitrella oxia – type locality for species
 †Mitrella pedana – type locality for species
 †Mitrella perfervida
 †Mitrella phagon – type locality for species
 †Mitrella photeina – type locality for species
 †Mitrella phyllisae – type locality for species
 †Mitrella sima – type locality for species
 †Mitrella stikta – type locality for species
 †Mitrella trajectionis
 †Mitrella turgidula
 †Mitrella tytha – type locality for species
  Mitromorpha
 †Mitromorpha dormitor
 Modiolaria
 Modiolus
  †Modiolus americanus
 †Modiolus blandus
 †Modiolus grammatus
 †Modiolus minimus
 †Modiolus silicatus
 Modulus
 †Modulus basileus
 †Modulus biconicus – type locality for species
 †Modulus caloosahatcheensis
 †Modulus calusa
 †Modulus carchedonius
 †Modulus compactus
 †Modulus liveoakensis
  †Modulus modulus
 †Modulus pacei
 †Modulus turbinatus
 †Modulus willcoxii
 †Modulus woodringi
 Moerella
 †Moerella calliglypta
 †Moerella candeana
 †Molleria
 †Molleria duplinensis
 Molothrus
  †Molothrus ater
 Monilispira
 †Monilispira archeri
 †Monilispira leucocyma – or unidentified comparable form
 Monoplex
 †Monoplex – type locality for species A informal
 †Monoplex krebsii
  †Monoplex parthenopeus
 †Monoplex ritteri
 †Monostiolum
 †Monostiolum petiti
 †Monostiolum thomasi
 †Montacula
 Montacuta
 †Montacuta chipolana
 †Montacuta floridana
 Montastraea
 †Montastraea bainbridgensis
 †Montastraea brevis
 †Montastraea cavernosa
 †Montastraea costata – or unidentified comparable form
 †Montastraea davisina – type locality for species
 †Montastraea endothecata
 †Montastraea imbata
 †Montastraea intermedia
 †Montastraea peninsularis – type locality for species
 †Montastraea tampaensis
 †Montezumella
 †Montezumella microporosa
 Mormoops
  †Mormoops megalophylla
   †Moropus
 †Moropus oregonensis – or unidentified comparable form
 †Mortonella
 Morum
 †Morum chipolanum – type locality for species
 †Morum floridanum
 †Morum macgintyi
 †Morum obrienae
  †Morum oniscus
 Morus
 †Morus peninsularis – type locality for species
  Mugil
 †Mulina
 †Mulina congesta
 †Mulina orthria – type locality for species
 Mulinia
 †Mulinia caloosaensis
 †Mulinia congesta
 †Mulinia lateralis
 †Mulinia orthria
 †Mulinia sapotila
 †Mulinia sapotilia
 †Mulinia sapotilla
  Murex
 †Murex bellegladensis
 †Murex chipolanus
 †Murex fulvenscens
 †Murex gilli – type locality for species
 †Murex globosus
 †Murex nicholsi – type locality for species
 †Murex salleanus
 †Murex tritonopsis
 †Murex trophoniformis
 Murexiella
 †Murexiella calhounensis – type locality for species
 †Murexiella crispangula
 †Murexiella glypta
 †Murexiella graceae
 †Murexiella macgintyi – type locality for species
 †Murexiella miamiensis
 †Murexiella petuchi
 †Murexiella shilohensis
 †Murexiella textilis
 Murexsul
 †Murexsul hexagonus
  Muricanthus
 †Muricanthus hertweckorum
  Muricopsis
 †Muricopsis lyonsi
 Musculium
 †Musculium securis
 Musculus
 †Musculus lateralis
 Mussa
 †Mussa affinis
  †Mussa angulosa
  Mussismilia
 †Mussismilia hispida
 Mustela
  †Mustela frenata
 †Mustela peninsulae
 †Mya
  †Mya arenaria
 †Myakkacypraea
 †Myakkacypraea kelleyi
 †Myakkacypraea myakka
 †Myakkacypraea schnireli
 Mycetophyllia
 †Mycetophyllia lamarckiana
 Mycteria
 †Mycteria americana
 †Mycteria wetmorei
 †Mylagaulus
 †Mylagaulus elassos – type locality for species
 †Mylagaulus kinseyi
 Myliobatis
  †Mylodon
  †Mylohyus
 †Mylohyus elmorei
 †Mylohyus floridanus – type locality for species
 †Mylohyus fossilis – type locality for species
 †Mylohyus lenis – or unidentified comparable form
 Myotis
 †Myotis austroriparius
  †Myotis grisescens
 Myrica
  †Myrica cerifera
 Myrtea
 †Myrtea waltonensis – type locality for species
 Mysella
 †Mysella planulata
 Mytiloconcha
 †Mytiloconcha conradiana
 †Mytiloconcha incurvus
 Mytilopsis
 †Mytilopsis lamellata
 †Mytilopsis leucophaeata
 Mytilus
 †Mytilus conradiana
 †Mytilus conradianus
 †Mytilus incrassata

N

  †Nannippus
 †Nannippus aztecus
 †Nannippus morgani
 †Nannippus peninsulatus
 †Nannippus westoni
  Nannodiella
 †Nannodiella nemorensis
 †Nannodiella pauca
 †Nanogyra
 †Nanogyra virgula
 †Nanosiren – type locality for genus
 †Nanosiren garciae – type locality for species
 †Nanotragulus
 †Nanotragulus loomisi
 Narona
 †Narona atraktoides – type locality for species
 Nassa – report made of unidentified related form or using admittedly obsolete nomenclature
 †Nassa consensa – or unidentified comparable form
  Nassarina
 †Nassarina glypta
 †Nassarina trachea – type locality for species
 Nassarius
 †Nassarius acutus
 †Nassarius anisonema – type locality for species
  †Nassarius antillarum
 †Nassarius berthae
 †Nassarius bidentata
 †Nassarius bidentatus
 †Nassarius bimitrodita – type locality for species
 †Nassarius caloosaensis
 †Nassarius cinclis – type locality for species
 †Nassarius consensa
 †Nassarius consensus – or unidentified comparable form
 †Nassarius cornelliana
 †Nassarius correlliana
 †Nassarius cystoides – type locality for species
 †Nassarius dalli
 †Nassarius dasa – type locality for species
 †Nassarius dasus
 †Nassarius dasynema – type locality for species
 †Nassarius dryas – type locality for species
 †Nassarius dystakta
 †Nassarius dystaktus
 †Nassarius ethelinda
 †Nassarius eutykta – type locality for species
 †Nassarius fargoi
 †Nassarius floridana
 †Nassarius floridensis
 †Nassarius grapta
 †Nassarius harisi – or unidentified related form
 †Nassarius harrisi
 †Nassarius ischna – type locality for species
 †Nassarius locklini
 †Nassarius nanna – type locality for species
 †Nassarius nannus
 †Nassarius opeas – type locality for species
 †Nassarius oxia – type locality for species
 †Nassarius parapristuis
 †Nassarius parapristus – type locality for species
 †Nassarius pedana – type locality for species
 †Nassarius pedanus
 †Nassarius pedona
 †Nassarius prista – type locality for species
 †Nassarius pristus
 †Nassarius quadridentata
 †Nassarius rasta
 †Nassarius tribaka – type locality for species
  †Nassarius vibex
 †Nassarius waltonensis
 †Nassarius watsoni
  Nasua – or unidentified comparable form
  Natica
 †Natica alticallosa
 †Natica caseyi
 Naticarius
 †Naticarius camera
  †Naticarius canrena
 †Naticarius plicatella
 †Naticarius precursor – type locality for species
 Natrix
 †Natrix cyclopion
 †Natrix erythrogaster – or unidentified comparable form
 †Neatocastor
 †Nebraskaophis
 †Nebraskaophis oligocenicus – type locality for species
  Necturus
 Negaprion
 †Negaprion brevirostris
 †Nekrolagus
 †Nekrolagus progressus
 Nellia
 †Nellia oscitans – type locality for species
 †Nellia tenella
 Nemocardium
 †Nemocardium parile
 †Neochoerus
 †Neochoerus aesopi
 †Neochoerus pinckneyi
 Neofiber
 †Neofiber alleni
 †Neofiber leonardi
  †Neohipparion
 †Neohipparion eurystyle
 †Neohipparion trampasense
 †Neolaganum
 †Neolaganum dalli
 †Neolaganum durhami
 Neomonachus
  †Neomonachus tropicalis
  Neophrontops
 †Neophrontops slaughteri
 †Neortyx
 †Neortyx peninsularis
 †Neosimnia
 †Neosimnia cristata – type locality for species
 †Neosimnia puella – type locality for species
 Neotoma
  †Neotoma floridana
 Nerita
 †Nerita tampaensis
 Neritina
 †Neritina sparsilineata – or unidentified comparable form
 †Neritina sphaerica
 †Neritina usnea
 †Neritina virginea
 †Neritopsis
 †Neritopsis vokesorum – type locality for species
  Nerodia
  †Nerodia fasciata
 †Nerodia sipedon
 †Nerodia taxispilota – or unidentified comparable form
 Nesovitrea
 †Nesovitrea dallilana
 Nettion
 †Nettion carolinense
 †Nettion crecca
 †Neurahytis
 †Neurahytis marshalli
  Neverita
 †Neverita chipolana
 †Neverita chipolanus
 †Neverita duplicatus
 †Neverita eucallosa
 †Neverita eucallosus – type locality for species
  †Nimravides
 †Nimravides galiani – type locality for species
 †Ninoziphius
 †Ninoziphius platyrostris
 Niso
 †Niso interrupta
 †Niso wilcoxiana
 †Niso willcoxiana
 Nitidella
 †Nitidella nitida
 Niveria
 †Niveria carlottae
 †Niveria quadripunctata
  †Niveria suffusa
 Nodipecten
 †Nodipecten caloosaensis
 †Nodipecten collierensis
 †Nodipecten condylomatus
  †Nodipecten nodosus
 †Nodipecten peedeensis
 †Nodipecten peedensis
 †Nodipecten pernodosus
 †Nodipecten pyx
 †Nodipecten vaccamavensis
 Noetia
 †Noetia incile
 †Noetia limula
 †Noetia platyura
 †Noetia playura
 Nonion
 †Nonion glabrellum
 †Nonion grateloupi
 †Nonion pizarrensis
 †Nonion preadvenum
 †Nonion washingtonensis
 Nonionella
 †Nonionella auris
 †Nothodipoides
 †Nothodipoides planus – or unidentified comparable form
 †Nothokemas
 †Nothokemas floridanus
 †Nothokemas waldropi – type locality for species
  †Nothrotheriops
 †Nothrotheriops texanus
 Notophthalmus
  †Notophthalmus viridescens
  Notorynchus
 †Notorynchus cepidianus
 †Nototamias
 †Nototamias hulberti
 Nucinella
 †Nucinella chipolana – type locality for species
 †Nucinella gunteri – type locality for species
 †Nucinella woodii – type locality for species
 Nucleolites
 †Nucleolites conradi
 †Nucleolites ericsoni
 †Nucleolites evergladensis – type locality for species
 †Nucleolites globosus
 †Nucleolites gouldii
 †Nucleolites lyelli
  Nucula
 †Nucula chipolana
 †Nucula dasa – type locality for species
 †Nucula defuniak – type locality for species
 †Nucula gadsdenensis
 †Nucula proxima
 †Nucula sinaria
 †Nucula tampae
 †Nucula taphria
 Nuculana
 †Nuculana acuta
 †Nuculana basilissa – type locality for species
 †Nuculana chipolana
 †Nuculana conica
 †Nuculana diphya – type locality for species
 †Nuculana dodona
 †Nuculana hamlinensis
 †Nuculana leiorhyncha – type locality for species
 †Nuculana leptalea – type locality for species
 †Nuculana linifera
 †Nuculana polychoa – type locality for species
 †Nuculana polychroa
 †Nuculana posti
 †Nuculana proteracuta – type locality for species
 †Nuculana trochilia
 Numenius
  †Numenius americanus
  Nummulites
 †Nummulites floridensis
 †Nummulites moodysbranchensis
 †Nummulites ocalanus – or unidentified comparable form
 †Nummulites ocalina
 Nyctanassa
  †Nyctanassa violacea – type locality for species
 Nycticeius
  †Nycticeius humeralis
 Nycticorax
 †Nycticorax fidens – type locality for species
 †Nycticorax nycticorax
 Nyroca
 †Nyroca affinis
 †Nyssa

O

 †Ocalaster – type locality for genus
 †Ocalaster seloyi – type locality for species
 †Ocalaster timucum – type locality for species
 †Ochetosella
 †Ochetosella jacksonica
 Ochrotomys
 †Ochrotomys nuttalli
 †Ocukina
 †Ocukina srasotaensis
  Oculina
 †Oculina diffusa
 †Oculina floridana
 †Oculina robusta
 †Oculina sarasotana – type locality for species
 Odocoileus
 †Odocoileus osceola
 †Odocoileus sellardsiae – type locality for species
  †Odocoileus virginianus
  Odontaspis
 †Odontaspis macrota
 Odostomia
 †Odostomia acutidens
 †Odostomia caloosaensis
  †Odostomia laevigata
 †Ogmophis
 †Ogmophis pauperrimus – type locality for species
 Olar
 †Olar buccinator
 †Oligobunis
 †Oligobunis floridanus – type locality for species
 †Oligopygus
 †Oligopygus haldemani
 †Oligopygus phelani
 †Oligopygus wetherby
 †Oligopygus wetherbyi
 Oliva
 †Oliva adami
 †Oliva alumensis
 †Oliva blowi
 †Oliva bollingi
 †Oliva briani
 †Oliva brooksvillensis
 †Oliva carolinae – or unidentified comparable form
 †Oliva carolinensis
 †Oliva cokyae
 †Oliva duerri
 †Oliva edwardsae
 †Oliva erici
 †Oliva eutorta
 †Oliva gravesae
 †Oliva immortua
 †Oliva jenniferae
 †Oliva keatoni
 †Oliva lindae
 †Oliva liodes
 †Oliva martensii
 †Oliva murielae
 †Oliva paraporphyria
 †Oliva posti
  †Oliva reticularis
 †Oliva roseae
 †Oliva rucksorum
 †Oliva ryani
  †Oliva sayana
 †Oliva smithorum
 †Oliva southbayensis
 †Oliva vokesorum – type locality for species
 †Oliva waltoniana – type locality for species
 †Oliva wendyae
 Olivella
 †Olivella clewistonensis
 †Olivella cotinados – type locality for species
 †Olivella dasa – type locality for species
 †Olivella dealbata
 †Olivella dodona
 †Olivella eleutheria – type locality for species
 †Olivella eleuthria
 †Olivella eutacta
 †Olivella fargoi
 †Olivella floralia
 †Olivella floridana
 †Olivella gladeensis
 †Olivella jacksonensis
 †Olivella lata
 †Olivella liveoakensis
 †Olivella mississippiensis – or unidentified related form
 †Olivella mutica
 †Olivella oryzoides – type locality for species
 †Olivella perfloralia
 †Olivella poinciana – type locality for species
 †Olivella pugilis
 †Olivella pusilla
 †Olivella tamiamiensis
 †Olivella vicksburgensis
 †Olssonella
 †Omanidacna – tentative report
 †Omanidacna gunteri
  Ondatra
 †Ondatra annectens
 †Ondatra idahoensis
 †Ondatra zibethicus
 Onoba
 †Onoba litiopaopsis – type locality for species
 †Ontocetus
 †Ontocetus emmonsi
  Onustus
 †Onustus grayi – type locality for species
 Opalia
 †Opalia deboury
 †Opalia debouryi
 Opheodrys
  †Opheodrys aestivus
 Ophidion
  †Ophiomorpha
 Ophisaurus
  †Ophisaurus compressus
 †Ophisaurus ventralis
 †Opisthomena
 †Opisthomena oglimum
  †Opsanus
 Orbicella
  †Orbicella annularis
 †Orbitoides
 Orbulina
 †Orbulina universa
 Orionina
 †Orionina bermudae
 †Orthaulax
 †Orthaulax gabbi
 †Orthaulax hernandoensis
 †Orthaulax inornatus
 †Orthaulax pugnax
 Orthogeomys
 †Orthogeomys propinetis
 Orthopristis
 †Orthopristis chrysopterus
 Oryzomys
  †Oryzomys palustris
 †Osbornodon
 †Osbornodon iamonensis
 †Osbornodon wangi – type locality for species
 †Oscilla
 †Oscilla biseriata
 Osthimosia
 †Osthimosia glomerata
 Ostrea
 †Ostrea brucei
 †Ostrea compressirostra
 †Ostrea coxi
 †Ostrea densata – or unidentified comparable form
 †Ostrea disparilis
 †Ostrea equestris
 †Ostrea falco
 †Ostrea geraldjohnsoni
 †Ostrea locklini
 †Ostrea meridionalis
 †Ostrea meridonalis
 †Ostrea normalis
 †Ostrea pauciplicata
 †Ostrea podagrina
 †Ostrea scuplturata
 †Ostrea subdigitalina
 †Ostrea vaughani
 †Otodus
   †Otodus megalodon
 Otus
 †Otus asio
  †Oxydactylus – tentative report
 †Oxyura
 †Oxyura hulberti – type locality for species
 †Oxyura jamaicensis
 †Oyenaster – type locality for genus
 †Oyenaster oblidus – type locality for species

P

 †Pachyarmatherium
 †Pachyarmatherium leiseyi – type locality for species
 †Pachycrommium
 †Pachycrommium brucei – type locality for species
 †Pachycrommium burnsii
 †Pachycrommium dalli
 †Pachycrommium dodonum – type locality for species
 †Pachycrommium floridana
 †Pachycrommium guppyi
 †Pachycrommium mansfieldi
 †Pachycrommium occiduum – type locality for species
 †Pahayokea
 †Pahayokea alligator
 †Pahayokea aspenae
 †Pahayokea basingerensis
 †Pahayokea erici
 †Pahayokea gabrielleae
 †Pahayokea josiai
 †Pahayokea kissimmeensis
 †Pahayokea mansfieldi
 †Pahayokea parodizi
 †Pahayokea penningtonorum
 †Pahayokea rucksorum
  †Palaeogale
 †Palaeogale minuta
 †Palaeolama
 †Palaeolama mirifica – type locality for species
  †Palaeophis
 †Palaeophoyx – type locality for genus
 †Palaeophoyx columbiana – type locality for species
 †Palaeostruthus
 †Palaeostruthus eurius – type locality for species
 Pallacera
 †Pallacera caseyi
 †Pallacera chipolanus
 †Pallacera costatus
 †Pallacera tribakus – type locality for species
 †Pallacera vicksburgensis
 †Pandanaris
 †Pandanaris convexa
 Pandion
  †Pandion haliaetus
 †Pandion lovensis – type locality for species
 Pandora
 †Pandora arenosa
 †Pandora bushiana
 †Pandora dodona
 †Pandora trilineata
 †Pandora tuomeyi
 Panopea
 †Panopea bitruncata
 †Panopea brooksvillensis
 †Panopea floridana
 †Panopea goldfussi
 †Panopea goldfussil
 †Panopea parawhitfieldi – type locality for species
 †Panopea reflexa
 Panthera
  †Panthera leo
  †Panthera onca
 †Papillina
 †Papillina gunteri – type locality for species
 Papyridea
 †Papyridea bulbosum
 †Papyridea semisulcata
 †Papyridea soleniformis
 †Parablastomeryx
 †Parablastomeryx floridanus – type locality for species
 †Parablastomeryx gregorii
 †Parabornia
 †Parabornia squillina
 Paraconcavus
 †Paraconcavus talquinensis
 Paracyathus
 †Paracyathus vaughani
 Paradentalium
 †Paradentalium disparile
   †Parahippus
 †Parahippus leonensis – type locality for species
 †Paramerychyus
 †Paramerychyus harrisonensis
  Parametaria
 †Parametaria hertweckorum
 †Parametaria lindae
  †Paramylodon
 †Paramylodon harlani
 †Paranasua
 †Paranasua biradica – type locality for species
 †Paraoxybelis – type locality for genus
 †Paraoxybelis floridanus – type locality for species
 †Parasatarte
 †Parasatarte triquetra
 Parastarte
 †Parastarte chipolana – type locality for species
 †Parastarte triquetra
  †Parotodus
 †Parotodus benedeni
 Parvanachis
 †Parvanachis obesa
 †Parvericius
 †Parvericius montanus
 Parvilucina
 †Parvilucina costata
 †Parvilucina crenella
 †Parvilucina crenulata
 †Parvilucina diktyota
 †Parvilucina flumenvadosa – type locality for species
 †Parvilucina multilineatus
 †Parvilucina multistriata
 †Parvilucina piluliformis
 †Parvilucina sphaeriolus
 †Parvilucina vaughani – type locality for species
  Parviturbo
 †Parviturbo milium
 Parviturboides
 †Parviturboides avitus
 Passerculus
  †Passerculus sandwichensis
  Passerella – or unidentified comparable form
 †Passerherbulus
 †Passerherbulus henslowii
  Passerina – or unidentified comparable form
 Patelloida
 †Patelloida pustulata
  Pecari
 Pecten
 †Pecten burnsi
 †Pecten burnsii
 †Pecten hemycyclicus
 †Pecten humphreysii
 †Pecten leonensis
 †Pecten ochlockoneensis
 †Pecten perplanus
 †Pecten poulsoni
 †Pecten wendelli
 †Pedalion
 †Pedalion kecia
 †Pedalion solereperta
 †Pediomeryx
 †Pediomeryx hemphillensis
 Pelecanus
  †Pelecanus erythrorhynchos – or unidentified comparable form
 †Pelecanus schreiberi
  †Peltosaurus
 †Peltosaurus floridanus – type locality for species
 Peneroplis
 †Periarchus
 †Periarchus floridans
 †Periarchus floridanus
 †Periarchus floridianus
 †Periarchus lyelli
 Perigastrella
 †Perigastrella depressa
 †Perigastrella ovoidea
 †Perigastrella tubulosa
  Periglypta
 †Periglypta caesarina
 †Periglypta tarquinia
 Periploma
 †Periploma discus – type locality for species
  Peristernia
 †Peristernia filicata
 Perna
 †Perna conradi
 †Perna conradiana
 †Perna incurvus
 Perognathus
 †Perognathus minutus – or unidentified comparable form
  Peromyscus
 †Peromyscus gossypinus
 †Peromyscus hagermanensis
 †Peromyscus polionotus
 †Peromyscus sarmocophinus – type locality for species
 Peronella
 †Peronella archerensis
 †Peronella crustuloides
 †Peronella cubae
 †Peronella dalli
 †Perplicaria
 †Perplicaria perplexa
  Persicula
 †Persicula amplior – type locality for species
 †Persicula calhounensis
 †Persicula dockeryi
 †Persicula macneili
 †Persicula ovula
 †Persicula suwanneensis
 Persististrombus
 †Persististrombus aldrichi
 †Persististrombus chipolanus
  Petaloconchus
 †Petaloconchus floridanus
 †Petaloconchus graniferus
 †Petaloconchus sculpturatus
 †Petaloconchus varians
 †Petauristodon
 †Petauristodon pattersoni
  Petricola
 †Petricola concoralla
 †Petricola hoerleae – type locality for species
 †Petricola lapicida
  †Petrolisthes
 †Petrolisthes myakkensis – type locality for species
 Petrophyllia
 †Petrophyllia limonensis
 Phacoides
 †Phacoides amabilis
 †Phacoides calhounensis
 †Phacoides chrysostoma
 †Phacoides disciformis
 †Phacoides eupheus – type locality for species
 †Phacoides flumenvadosa
 †Phacoides hernandoensis
 †Phacoides hillsboroensis – tentative report
 †Phacoides hillsboroughensis – tentative report
 †Phacoides nasuta – or unidentified related form
 †Phacoides nereididetus
 †Phacoides parawhitfieldi
 †Phacoides pectinata
 †Phacoides pectinatus – or unidentified comparable form
 †Phacoides sphaeriolus
 †Phacoides tampaensis
 †Phacoides tuomeyi
 †Phacoides wacissanus
 Phalacrocorax
  †Phalacrocorax auritus
 †Phalacrocorax filyawi – type locality for species
 †Phalacrocorax idahensis
 †Phalacrocorax wetmorei – type locality for species
 †Phalacrocorax wvetmorei – or unidentified comparable form
 Phalium
 †Phalium caelatura
 †Phalium globosum
 †Phalium inflatum
 †Phalium murryi
  †Phlaocyon
 †Phlaocyon achoros
 †Phlaocyon leucosteus
 †Phlaocyon taylori – type locality for species
 †Phoberocyon
 †Phoberocyon johnhenryi
 †Phocanella
 †Phocanella pumila
 Phoenicopterus
 †Phoenicopterus copei
 †Phoenicopterus floridanus
  †Phoenicopterus ruber
 Pholadomya
  Phos
 †Phos parrishi – type locality for species
 †Phos sloani
 †Phos ursula
 †Phos vadosus
 Phrontis
 †Phrontis vibex
 †Phugatherium
 †Phugatherium dichroplax
 Phylactella
 †Phylactella parvicollum
 Phyllacanthus
 †Phyllacanthus mortoni
 †Phyllangia
 †Phyllangia americana
 †Phyllangia blakei – type locality for species
 Phyllonotus
 †Phyllonotus evergladesensis
 †Phyllonotus globosus
 †Phyllonotus labelleensis
 †Phyllonotus leonensis
 †Phyllonotus martinshugari
  †Phyllonotus pomum
 †Phyllonotus tritonopsis
 †Phyllonotus trophoniformis
 †Phymotaxis
 †Phymotaxis mansfieldi
  Physa
 †Physa meigsi
 Physella
 †Physella heterostropha
 †Physeterula
 Physodon
 †Physodon triqueter
 †Physogaleus
 †Physogaleus contortus
 Pica
 †Pica pica
 Picoides
  †Picoides villosus – or unidentified comparable form
 Pilsbryspira
 †Pilsbryspira leucocyma
 Pinctada
 †Pinctada imbricata
 Pinna
 Pinus
 †Pinus caribaea
  †Pinus taeda
 †Pipilio
 †Pipilio erythrophthalmus
 Pipilo
 †Pipilo erythrophthalmus
 Pipistrellus
 †Pipistrellus subflavus
 Pisania
 †Pisania nux
  †Piscobalaena
 †Pistia
 †Pistia spathulata
 Pitar
 †Pitar cordatus
 †Pitar cypta
 †Pitar floridana
 †Pitar morrhuanus
 †Pitar prosayana
 †Pitar simpsoni
 †Pitar waltonensis
 Pitarella
 †Pitarella calceola
 Pituophis
 †Pituophis melanoleucas
  †Pituophis melanoleucus
 Pitymys
 †Pitymys mcnowni – or unidentified comparable form
 Placunanomia
 †Placunanomia burnsi
 †Placunanomia floridana
 †Placunanomia plicata
 †Plagiarca
 †Plagiarca arcula
 †Plagiarca rhomboidella – or unidentified comparable form
 Plagiobrissus
 †Plagiobrissus curvus
 †Plagiobrissus dixie
 †Plagiosmittia
 †Plagiosmittia incrustans – type locality for species
 †Plagiosmittia regularis
 †Planecphora
 †Planecphora hertweckorum
 †Planecphora mansfieldi
 †Planicardium
 †Planicardium virginianum
 †Planorbella
 †Planorbella conanti
 †Planorbella disstoni
  †Planorbella duryi
 †Planorbella scalaris
 Planorbis
 †Planorbis elisus
 †Planorbis tampaensis
 †Planorbis willcoxii
 Planularia – tentative report
  †Platybelodon
   †Platygonus
 †Platygonus bicalcaratus
 †Platygonus compressus
 †Platygonus vetus
 †Platylepas
 †Platylepas wilsoni
 †Playgonus
 Plecotus
 †Plecotus rafinesquii
 Plectodon
 †Plectodon granulatus
 †Plectodon scabrata
 Plectofrondicularia
 †Plectofrondicularia mansfieldi
  Plegadis
 †Pleiorhytis
 †Pleiorhytis centenaria
 †Pleiorytis
 †Pleiorytis bowenae
 Plethodon
  †Plethodon glutinosus
 †Pleurodonte
 †Pleurodonte crusta
 †Pleurodonte cunctator
 †Pleurodonte diespiter
 †Pleurodonte haruspica
 †Pleurodonte kendrickensis
 Pleurofusia
 †Pleurofusia brooksvillensis
 †Pleurofusia dowlingi
 †Pleurofusia plutonica
 †Pleurofusia servata
 †Pleuroliria
 Pleuromeris
 †Pleuromeris aposcitula
 †Pleuromeris apsocitula
 †Pleuromeris decemcostata
 †Pleuromeris pitysia
 †Pleuromeris scitula
 †Pleuromeris scituloides
 †Pleuromeris tellia
 †Pleuromeris tridentata
  Pleuroploca
 †Pleuroploca lindae
 Plicatula
 †Plicatula densata
 †Plicatula gibbosa
 †Plicatula lepidota – type locality for species
 †Plicatula romosa
 †Pliocyon
 †Pliocyon robustus
 †Pliogyps
 †Pliogyps charon – type locality for species
  †Pliohippus
 †Pliohippus mirabilis
 †Pliohippus pernix
 †Pliometanastes
 †Pliometanastes protistus – type locality for species
 †Plionarctos
 †Plionictis – tentative report
  †Plithocyon – or unidentified comparable form
  Pocillopora
 †Pocillopora baracoaensis
 †Pocillopora crassoramosa
 Podiceps
  †Podiceps auritus
 †Podiceps dixi
 Podilymbus
 †Podilymbus magnus
 †Podilymbus podiceps
 Pododesmus
 †Pododesmus scopelus
 Podomys
 †Podomys floridanus
 †Poecilia
  †Poecilia latipinna
 Pogonias
 †Pogonias cromis
  Poirieria
 †Poirieria alaquaensis
 †Poirieria clarksvillensis – type locality for species
 †Poirieria fusinoides – type locality for species
 †Poirieria heilprini
 †Poirieria laccopoia – type locality for species
 †Poirieria lychnia – type locality for species
 †Poirieria mauryae – type locality for species
 †Poirieria phagon – type locality for species
 †Poirieria rufirupicolus
 †Polidevcia
 †Polidevcia flexuosa
 Polinices
 †Polinices caroliniana
 †Polinices coensis
 †Polinices demicryptus
  †Polinices hepaticus
 †Polinices judsoni
  †Polinices lacteus
 †Polinices porcellanus
 †Polinices robustus – type locality for species
 †Polinices uber
 Polygireulima
 †Polygireulima calkinsi
 †Polygireulima chipolana
 †Polygireulima conchita
 †Polygireulima defuniak – type locality for species
 †Polygireulima fargoi
 †Polygireulima gibberula
 †Polygireulima magnoliana
 †Polygireulima makista
 †Polygireulima suavis
 Polygonum
 Polygyra
 †Polygyra adamnis
 †Polygyra cereolus
  †Polygyra septemvolva
 Polymorphina
 †Polymorphina advena – or unidentified comparable form
 Polyschides
 †Polyschides lobion – type locality for species
 †Polyschides quadridentatus
 Polystira
  †Polystira albida
 †Polystira albidata – or unidentified loosely related form
 †Polystira albidoides – type locality for species
 †Polystira subsimilis
 †Polystira tampensis
 †Polystira tenagos – type locality for species
 Pomacea
  †Pomacea paludosa
 Pomatodelphis
 †Pomatodelphis bobengi – type locality for species
 †Pomatodelphis inaequalis – type locality for species
 Poricellaria
 †Poricellaria vernoni – type locality for species
 Porites
  †Porites astreoides
 †Porites barracoaensis
 †Porites chipolanum – type locality for species
 †Porites divaricata
 †Porites floridaeprima
 †Porites furcata
 †Porites matanzaensis
  †Porites porites
 Poromya
 †Poromya floridana
 †Poropeltarion – type locality for genus
 †Poropeltarion newelli – type locality for species
 Porphyrula
  †Porphyrula martinica
 Portunus
 Porzana
 †Porzana auffenbergi – type locality for species
 †Porzana carolina
  †Potamides
 †Potamides aspalagensis
 †Potamides cornutus – tentative report
 †Potamides hillsboroensis
 †Potamides suprasulcatus
 †Potamides transecta
 †Pratilepus – tentative report
 †Primonatalus – type locality for genus
 †Primonatalus prattae – type locality for species
 Prionocidaris
 †Prionocidaris cookei
 Prionotus
 †Prismacerithium
 †Prismacerithium prisma
 Pristis
 †Pristis aquitanicus
 †Proacris – type locality for genus
 †Proacris mintoni – type locality for species
 †Probalearica
 †Probalearica crataegensis – type locality for species
  †Procamelus
 †Procamelus grandis
  †Procranioceras
 †Procranioceras skinneri – or unidentified comparable form
 Procyon
  †Procyon lotor – type locality for species
 †Proheteromys
 †Proheteromys floridanus – type locality for species
 †Promantellum
 †Promantellum florpacifica
 †Promilio
 †Promilio brodkorbi – type locality for species
 †Promilio epileus – type locality for species
 †Promilio floridanus – type locality for species
 †Pronotolagus
 †Propelargus
 †Propelargus olseni – type locality for species
 †Prosthennops
 †Prosthennops xiphodonticus
 †Prosynthetoceras
 †Prosynthetoceras texanus
 †Protocardia
 †Protocardia jacksonense
 †Protocitta
 †Protocitta dixi
  †Protohippus
 †Protohippus gidleyi
 †Protohippus perditus
 †Protohippus supremus
 †Protosciurus
 †Protosiren
 †Protospermophilus – tentative report
  Prunum
 †Prunum amabile
 †Prunum apalachee – type locality for species
 †Prunum apicinum
 †Prunum aurora
 †Prunum bellum
 †Prunum capsa – type locality for species
 †Prunum donovani
 †Prunum eleutheria – type locality for species
 †Prunum ericae
  †Prunum guttatum
 †Prunum inntensa
 †Prunum jessicae
 †Prunum limatulum
 †Prunum lipara – type locality for species
 †Prunum myrina
 †Prunum oliviformis
 †Prunum onichidella
 †Prunum precursor
 †Prunum roscidum
 †Prunum sandrae
 Psammacoma
 †Psammacoma holmesii – tentative report
 †Psammacoma hosfordensis
 †Psammacoma marmorea – type locality for species
 †Psammacoma tageliformis
 †Psammacoma torynoides – type locality for species
  Psammechinus
 Psammotreta
 †Psammotreta intastriata
 †Psamosolen
 †Psamosolen aldrichi – type locality for species
 †Psamosolen sanctidominica – or unidentified related form
  †Psephophorus
 Pseudacris
  †Pseudacris ornata
 †Pseudadusta
 †Pseudadusta hertweckorum
 †Pseudadusta kalafuti
 †Pseudadusta ketteri
 †Pseudadusta lindae
 †Pseudadusta marilynae
 Pseudemys
 †Pseudemys caelata – type locality for species
 †Pseudemys concinna
 †Pseudemys floridana
  †Pseudemys nelsoni
 †Pseudemys platymarginata
 †Pseudemys williamsi
  †Pseudhipparion
 †Pseudhipparion curtivallum
 †Pseudhipparion simpsoni
 †Pseudhipparion skinneri
 †Pseudoaluca
 †Pseudoaluca clarki – type locality for species
 †Pseudoaluco
 †Pseudoaluco clarki
  †Pseudobranchus
 †Pseudobranchus robustus – type locality for species
 †Pseudobranchus vetustus – type locality for species
 †Pseudocemophora – type locality for genus
 †Pseudocemophora antiqua – type locality for species
 †Pseudoceras
 †Pseudoceras skinneri
  Pseudochama
 †Pseudochama chipolana
 †Pseudochama corticosa
 †Pseudochama striata
  Pseudodiploria
 †Pseudodiploria clivosa
 †Pseudodiploria sarasotana
 †Pseudodiploria strigosa
 Pseudomiltha
 †Pseudomiltha paranodonta – type locality for species
 Pseudosuccinea
 †Pseudosuccinea columella
 Pseudotorinia
 †Pseudotorinia bisulcata
 †Pseudotorinia nupera
 Pseudozonaria
 †Pseudozonaria portelli
  Psilaxis
 †Psilaxis verecunda
 Pteria
 †Pteria chipolana
 †Pteria colymbus
 †Pteria multangula
  Pterocarya
 †Pterohytis
 †Pterohytis conradi
 Pteromeris
 †Pteromeris perplana
 Pteropurpura
 †Pteropurpura dryas – type locality for species
 †Pteropurpura virginiae
 †Pterorhytis
 †Pterorhytis fluviana
 †Pterorhytis lindae
 †Pterorhytis marshalli
 †Pterorhytis roxaneae
 †Pterorhytis seminola
 †Pterorhytis squamulosa
 †Pterorhytis umbrifer
 †Pterorhytis wilsoni
 Pterorytis
 †Pterorytis dryas
 †Pterosphenus
 †Pterosphenus schucherti
 Pterotyphis
 †Pterotyphis calhounensis – type locality for species
 †Pterotyphis triangularis
 †Pterotyphis vokesae
 †Pterygoboa
  Pterynotus
 †Pterynotus hoerlei – type locality for species
 †Pterynotus phyllopterus
 †Pterynotus pinnatus
 †Pterynotus propeposti
 †Ptychosalpinx
 †Ptychosalpinx duerri
 Puffinus
 †Puffinus micraulax – type locality for species
  †Puffinus puffinus
 Pugnus
 †Pugnus lachrimula
  †Puma
 †Puma concolor
 Pupoides
 †Pupoides albilabris
 †Pupoides pilsbryi
 Puriana
 †Puriana rugipunctata
 Purpura
 †Purpura haemostoma
 †Purpura marshalli
 †Purpura postii
 †Purpura scabrosa
 Pusula
 †Pusula crovoae
 †Pusula dadeensis
 †Pusula lindajoyceae
 †Pusula miccosukee
  †Pusula pediculus
  Pycnodonte
 †Pycnodonte antiguensis – or unidentified related form
 †Pycnodonte leeana
 †Pycnodonte trigonalis
 Pygmaepterys
 †Pygmaepterys drezi – type locality for species
 †Pygmaepterys pratulum – type locality for species
  Pyramidella
 †Pyramidella suturalis
 †Pyrazisinus
 †Pyrazisinus acutus
 †Pyrazisinus campanulatus
 †Pyrazisinus cornutus
 †Pyrazisinus ecarinatus
 †Pyrazisinus gravesae
 †Pyrazisinus intermedius
 †Pyrazisinus kendrewi
 †Pyrazisinus kissimmeensis
 †Pyrazisinus lindae
 †Pyrazisinus palmbeachensis
 †Pyrazisinus roseae
 †Pyrazisinus sarastoaensis
 †Pyrazisinus scalatus
 †Pyrazisinus scalinus
 †Pyrazisinus turriculis
 †Pyrazisinus ultimus – type locality for species
 †Pyrazosomis
 †Pyrazosomis miamiensis
  Pyrazus
 †Pyrazus scalatus
 Pyrgocythara
 †Pyrgocythara coxi
 †Pyrgocythara plicosa
 Pyrgoma
 †Pyrgoma preftoridanum
 Pyrgospira
 †Pyrgospira acurugata
 †Pyrgospira ostrearum
  †Pyrgospira tampaensis
 †Pyrigiscus
 †Pyrigiscus parkeri – or unidentified comparable form
 †Pyrigiscus sisphusi – or unidentified comparable form
 †Pyrigiscus tellusae – or unidentified comparable form
 †Pyrigiscus yama – or unidentified comparable form
 †Pyruconus
 †Pyruconus druidi
 †Pyurella
 †Pyurella demistriatum
 †Pyurella seminole
 †Pyurella turbinalis

Q

 Quercus
 †Quercus brevifolia
 †Quercus chapmani – tentative report
 †Quercus laurifolia
  †Quercus virginiana
 Querquedula
 †Querquedula discors
 †Querquedula floridana
 †Querquedula floridiana – type locality for species
 Quinqueloculina
 †Quinqueloculina lamarckiana
 †Quinqueloculina seminula
 †Quinqueloculina subpoeyana – tentative report
 Quiscalus
  †Quiscalus major
 †Quiscalus mexicanus
 †Quiscalus quiscula

R

 Radiolucina
 †Radiolucina amianta
 †Radiolucina arrionta
 Raeta
 †Raeta plicatella
 †Rakomeryx
 Rallus
  †Rallus elegans
 †Rallus limicola
 †Rallus longirostris
 †Rana
 †Rana capito
 †Rana catesbeiana
  †Rana grylio
 †Rana pipiens
 †Rana utricularia
 Rangia
 †Rangia cuneata
 †Rangia cyrenoides – or unidentified comparable form
 Rapana
 †Rapana vaughani
 Recurvirostra
  †Recurvirostra americana
 †Regina – or unidentified comparable form
 †Regina alleni
 Reithrodontomys
 †Reithrodontomys humulis
 †Reithrodontomys wetmorei
  Reteporella
 †Reteporella scutulata
 †Reticulocythereis
 †Reticulocythereis floridana
 Retilaskeya
 †Retilaskeya bicolor
 Retusa – tentative report
 †Retusa vaginata
 Reusella
 †Reusella spinulosa
 Reussella
 †Reussella eocena
 †Reussella spinulosa
 Rhadinaea
 †Rhadinaea flavilata
 †Rhadinea
 †Rhadinea flavilata
 †Rhegminornis
 †Rhegminornis calobates – type locality for species
 Rhineura
  †Rhineura floridana
 Rhinoclavis
 †Rhinoclavis caloosaenis
 †Rhinoclavis caloosaensis
 †Rhinoclavis chipolana
 †Rhinoclavis ocalana
 †Rhinoclavis parrishi – type locality for species
 Rhinoptera
  †Rhinoptera bonasus
 Rhizoprionodon
  †Rhizoprionodon terraenovae
 †Rhizoprionodon terranovae
 Rhyncholampas
 †Rhyncholampas chipolanus
 †Rhyncholampas ericsoni
 †Rhyncholampas evergladensis
 †Rhyncholampas globosus
 †Rhyncholampas gouldii
  †Rhynchotherium
 †Rhynchotherium edense
 †Richmondena
 †Richmondena cardinalis
 Rictaxis
 †Rictaxis fusulus
 †Rictaxis myakkanus
 Rimella
 †Rimella smithii
 Rimula
 †Rimula woodringi
 Ringicula
 †Ringicula boyntoni – type locality for species
 †Ringicula chipolana
 †Ringicula floridana
 †Ringicula semilimata
 †Ringicula stiphera – type locality for species
  Rissoa
 †Rissoa lipeus
 †Rissoa phagon – type locality for species
  Rissoina
 †Rissoina bulimina
 †Rissoina catesbyana
 †Rissoina chesnelii
 †Rissoina chipolana
 †Rissoina floridana
 †Rissoina juncea – type locality for species
 †Rissoina liriope
 †Rissoina parkeri
 †Rissoina planata
 †Rissoina sagraiana
 †Rissoina striatocostata
 †Rissonia
 †Rissonia supralaevigata
 Robulus
 †Robulus americanus
 †Robulus iotus
 †Robulus vaughani
 Rosseliana
 †Rosseliana parvipora
 Rostellaria
 †Rostellaria watermani
 †Rotalia
 †Rotalia beccarii
 †Rotalia cushmani
 †Rothpletzia
 †Rothpletzia floridana – type locality for species
 Roxania
 †Roxania chipolana
 †Roxania funiakensis
 Rupellaria
 †Rupellaria grinnelli
  Ruppia – or unidentified related form

S

 Sabal
  †Sabal palmetto
 Saccella
 †Saccella canonica
 †Saccella polychoa
 †Saccella trochilia
 †Saccharoturris
 †Saccharoturris centrodes – type locality for species
 †Sagitteria
 †Sarcenaria
 †Sarcenaria acutauricularis
  Sardinella
 Sassia
 †Sassia jacksonensis – type locality for species
  †Satherium
 †Satherium piscinarium
 †Scala
 †Scala virginiae
 †Scalanassa
 †Scalanassa evergladensis
 †Scalanassa olssoni
  †Scaldicetus
 †Scalla
 †Scalopoides – or unidentified related form
 Scalopus
 †Scalopus aquaticus
 Scalpellum
 †Scalpellum gibbum
 †Scambula
 †Scambula alaquensis
  Scaphander
 †Scaphander ballista
 †Scaphander ballistus
 †Scaphander langdoni
 †Scaphander richardsi – type locality for species
 Scapharca
 †Scapharca campechiensis
 Scaphella
 †Scaphella brennmortoni
 †Scaphella floridana
 †Scaphella gravesae
 †Scaphella griffini
  †Scaphella junonia
 †Scaphella martinshugari
 †Scaphella maureenae
 †Scaphella oleiniki
 †Scaphella seminole
 †Scaphella tenholmii
 †Scaphella tomscotti
 †Scaphella trenhomii
 Scaphiopus
 †Scaphiopus holbrooki
  †Scaphiopus holbrookii
 †Schisomopora
 †Schisomopora umbonata
 Schizaster
 †Schizaster americanus
 †Schizaster ocalanus
 †Schizobathysella
 †Schizobathysella saccifera
 Schizomavella
 †Schizomavella arborea
 †Schizomavella granulifera
 †Schizomavella granulosa
 †Schizomavella porosa
  Schizoporella
 †Schizoporella gunteri – type locality for species
 †Schizoporella marginata
 †Schizoporella viminea
 †Sciadopitys
 †Sciaenopus
 †Sciaenopus ocellatus
 Sciuropterus
 †Sciuropterus volans
 Sciurus
  †Sciurus carolinensis
 †Sciurus niger
 Scolopax
 †Scolopax hutchensi – type locality for species
  †Scolopax minor
 Scolymia
 †Scolymia lacera
 Sconsia
 †Sconsia hodgii
 †Sconsia paralaevigata – type locality for species
 †Sconsia prolongata
 Scrupocellaria
 †Scrupocellaria gracilis
 †Scupocellaria
 †Scupocellaria elliptica
 †Scupocellaria gracilis
 †Scutella
 †Scutella aberti
 Sedilia
 †Sedilia aphanitoma
 †Sedilia hoplophorus – or unidentified comparable form
 †Sedilia ochoida – or unidentified comparable form
 †Sedilia ochoidia
 †Sedilia ondulum
 †Sedilia sapa
 †Sedilia transa
  Seila
 †Seila adamsii
 †Seila clavulus
 Semele
 †Semele alumensis
 †Semele alumrensis
 †Semele bellastriata
 †Semele carinata
 †Semele chipolana
 †Semele compacta
 †Semele cytheroidea
 †Semele ebllastriata
 †Semele mutica
 †Semele nuculoides
 †Semele paramutica – type locality for species
 †Semele perlamellosa
 †Semele proficua
 †Semele purpurascens
 †Semele sardonica
 †Semele scintillata
 †Semele sellardsi
 †Semele silicata
 †Semele smithii
 †Semele stearnsii
 †Semele striulata
 †Semele taracodes – type locality for species
 Semelina
 †Semelina nuculoides
  Semicassis
 †Semicassis aldrichi
  †Semicassis granulata
 †Seminoleconus
 †Seminoleconus diegelae
 †Seminoleconus violetae
 †Septastrea
 †Septastrea crassa
 †Septastrea marylandica
 †Septastrea matsoni
 †Seraphs
 †Seraphs belemnitum – type locality for species
  †Serenoa
 †Serenoa serrulata
  Serpula
 Serpulorbis
 †Serpulorbis ballistae
 †Serpulorbis decussatus
 †Serpulorbis granifera
 †Serpulorbis papulosus
 Siderastrea
 †Siderastrea banksi – type locality for species
 †Siderastrea dalli
 †Siderastrea hillsboroensis – type locality for species
 †Siderastrea pliocenica
 †Siderastrea radians
  †Siderastrea siderea
 †Siderastrea silecensis – type locality for species
 Sigatica
 †Sigatica semisulcata
 Sigmodon
 †Sigmodon bakeri – type locality for species
 †Sigmodon curtisi
  †Sigmodon hispidus
 †Sigmodon libitinus
 †Sigmodon minor
  Simnia
 †Simnia terminatincta – type locality for species
 Simnialena
 †Simnialena oryzagrana – type locality for species
 Sincola
 †Sincola gunteri
  Sinum
 †Sinum chipolanum
 †Sinum dodoneum – type locality for species
 †Sinum imperforatum
 †Sinum mississippiensis
 †Sinum multilineatum
 †Sinum perspectivum
 †Sinum polandi
 †Sinum waltonense – type locality for species
 Siphocypraea
 †Siphocypraea brantleyi
 †Siphocypraea cannoni
 †Siphocypraea carolinensis
 †Siphocypraea dimasi
 †Siphocypraea duerri
 †Siphocypraea griffini
 †Siphocypraea grovesi
 †Siphocypraea metae
 †Siphocypraea mulepenensis
 †Siphocypraea philemoni
 †Siphocypraea problematica
 †Siphocypraea transitoria
 †Siphocypraea trippeana
 Siphonochelus
 †Siphonochelus linguiferus
 †Siphonochelus siphonifera
 †Siren
 †Siren hesterna – type locality for species
  †Siren lacertina
 †Siren simpsoni – type locality for species
 Sistrurus
  †Sistrurus miliarius
 Smaragdia
 †Smaragdia chipolana
 †Smaragdia grammica – type locality for species
 †Smaragdia viridis
   †Smilodon
 †Smilodon fatalis
 †Smilodon gracilis
 Smittina
 †Smittina jacksonica
 †Smittina portentosa
 †Smittina strombecki
 †Smittina telum
 Smittipora
 †Smittipora elliptica
 †Smittipora fusiformis
 †Smittipora levigata
 †Smittipora plicata
 †Smittipora sagittellaria
 †Smittipora tenuis
  Solariella
 †Solariella laqua
 †Solariella turritella
 †Solariella vaughani
 Solariorbis
 †Solariorbis blakei
 †Solariorbis eugenes
 †Solariorbis funiculus
 †Solariorbis infracarinatus
 †Solariorbis microforatis
 †Solariorbis mooreanus
 †Solariorbis opsitelotus
  Solecurtus
 †Solecurtus cumingianus
 †Solecurtus sanctaemarthae
 Solen
 †Solen amphistemma
 Solenastrea
 †Solenastrea bournoni
 †Solenastrea globosa
 †Solenastrea hyades
 Solenosteira
 †Solenosteira cancellaria
 †Solenosteira mengeana
 †Solenosteira mulepenensis
 †Solenosteira suwanneensis
 †Solenosteria
 †Solenosteria quinquespina
 Somateria
  †Somateria spectabilis – or unidentified comparable form
 Sorex
  †Sorex longirostris
 Sorites
 †Sorites marginalis
 Spathochlamys
 †Spathochlamys vaginula
 Spatula
 †Spatula cylpeata
 Speotyto
  †Speotyto cunicularia
 Spermophilus
 Sphaerogypsina
 †Sphaerogypsina globula
 Sphenia
 †Sphenia attenuata
 †Sphenia tumida
 Spheniopsis
 †Spheniopsis americana
 †Sphenophalos
 †Sphenophalos garciae
 Sphyraena
  †Sphyraena barracuda
  Sphyrna
 Spilogale
 †Spilogale putorius
 †Spineoterebra
 †Spineoterebra psilis
 †Spinifulgur
 †Spinifulgur gemmulatum
 †Spiraxis – tentative report
 †Spiraxis tampae
 Spiroloculina
 †Spiroloculina dentata
 †Spiroloculina reticulosa
 †Spirolplectamina
 †Spirolplectamina barrowi – or unidentified comparable form
 Spirorbis
 Spisula
 †Spisula craspedota – type locality for species
 †Spisula incrassata
  Spizaetus
 †Spizaetus grinnelli
 Spizella
 †Spizella passerina
 †Spizella pusilla
 Splendrillia
 Spondylus
  †Spondylus americanus
 †Spondylus bostrychites
 †Spondylus chipolanus
 †Spondylus hollisteri
 †Spondylus rotundatus
 Sportella
 †Sportella constricta
 †Sportella leura – type locality for species
 †Sportella lioconcha
 †Sportella lubrica
 †Sportella obolus
 †Sportella protexta
 †Sportella unicarinata
  †Squalodon – tentative report
 †Stamenocella
 †Stamenocella grandis
 †Stamenocella inferaviculifera
 †Stamenocella mediaviculifera
 †Staminocella
 †Staminocella inferaviculifera
 Steginoporella
 †Steginoporella cellariiformis – type locality for species
 †Steginoporella incrustans
 †Steginoporella jacksonica
  †Stellifer
 †Stellifer lanceolatus
 Stephanocoenia
 †Stephanocoenia spongiformis
 Stercorarius
  Sternotherus
 Stewartia
 †Stewartia anodonta
 †Stewartia floridana
  Sthenictis
 †Sthenictis lacota – or unidentified comparable form
 Stigmaulax
 †Stigmaulax guppiana
 †Stigmaulax guppiona
 †Stigmaulax polypum
 Stilosoma
 †Stilosoma vetustum – type locality for species
 Storeria
 †Storeria dekayi
 †Stralopecten
 †Stralopecten caloosaensis
 †Stralopecten ernestsmithi
  Stramonita
 †Stramonita haemostoma
 †Stramonita penelaevis
 †Stramonita sarasotana
  †Striatolamia
 †Striatolamia macrota
 Strigilla
 †Strigilla mirabilis
 †Strigilla paraflexuosa – type locality for species
 †Strigilla sphaerion – type locality for species
  Strioterebrum
 †Strioterebrum bipartitum
 †Strioterebrum brightonensis
 †Strioterebrum chipolana
 †Strioterebrum concava
 †Strioterebrum dislocata
 †Strioterebrum dislocatum
 †Strioterebrum eskata – type locality for species
 †Strioterebrum eskatum
 †Strioterebrum gausapatum
 †Strioterebrum langdoni
 †Strioterebrum onslowensis
 †Strioterebrum petiti
 †Strioterebrum psesta – type locality for species
 †Strioterebrum psestum
 †Strioterebrum pupiformis – type locality for species
 †Strioterebrum rabdota – type locality for species
 †Strioterebrum rabdotum
 †Strioterebrum raptum – type locality for species
 †Strioterebrum seminolum
 †Strioterebrum spiriferum
 †Strioterebrum vertebralis
 †Strioterebrum vinosa
 †Strioterebrum waltonense
 †Strioterebrum waltonensis – type locality for species
 Strix
  †Strix varia
  Strobilops
 †Strobilops hubbardi
 †Strobilops texanianus
 Strombiformis
 †Strombiformis dalli
 †Strombiformis ischna – type locality for species
 †Strombiformis leonensis
 †Strombiformis scotti
  Strombina
 †Strombina aldrichi
 †Strombina ceryx – type locality for species
 †Strombina gunteri
 †Strombina lampra – type locality for species
 †Strombina lissa – type locality for species
 †Strombina margarita
 †Strombina waltonia – type locality for species
 †Strombina waltoniana
 †Strombinophos
 †Strombinophos maxwelli
 †Strombinophos vadosus – type locality for species
 Strombus
  †Strombus alatus
 †Strombus brachior
 †Strombus diegelae
 †Strombus dodoneus – type locality for species
 †Strombus dominator
 †Strombus erici
 †Strombus evergladensis
 †Strombus floridanus
 †Strombus hertweckorum
 †Strombus holeylandicus
 †Strombus jonesorum
 †Strombus keatonorum
 †Strombus leidyi
 †Strombus lindae
 †Strombus liocyclus
 †Strombus mayacensis
 †Strombus pugilis
 †Strombus raninus
 †Strombus scotti
 Sturnella
  †Sturnella magna
 †Stylocoenia
 †Stylocoenia pumpellyi – or unidentified comparable form
 Stylophora
 †Stylophora affinis
 †Stylophora granulata
 †Stylophora imperatoris
 †Stylophora minor
 †Stylophora minutissima
 †Stylophora undata – type locality for species
 †Suaptenos – type locality for genus
 †Suaptenos whitei – type locality for species
 †Subantilocapra
 †Subantilocapra garciae
  Subcancilla
 †Subcancilla compsa
 Sula
 †Sula guano – type locality for species
 †Sula phosphata – type locality for species
 †Sula universitatis – type locality for species
 Sulcoretusa
 †Sulcoretusa chipolana
 †Sulcoretusa prosulcata
 †Sulcularia
 †Sulcularia chipolana
 †Sulcularia prosulcata – type locality for species
 †Sulcularia sulcata
 †Superlucina
 †Superlucina megameris
 †Suwannescapha
 †Suwannescapha lindae
 †Sycospira – type locality for genus
 †Sycospira eocenica – type locality for species
 †Sycospira eocensis
 †Syllomus – or unidentified comparable form
 Sylvilagus
 †Sylvilagus floridanus
  †Sylvilagus palustris
 †Sylvilagus webbi – type locality for species
 †Symbiangia – type locality for genus
 †Symbiangia vaughani – type locality for species
  Synaptomys
 †Synaptomys australis
 †Synaptomys morgani – type locality for species
 Syncera
 †Syncera microgaza – type locality for species
 Synodus
  †Synodus foetens – or unidentified comparable form
  †Synthetoceras
 †Synthetoceras tricornatus – or unidentified comparable form
 Syntomodrillia
 †Syntomodrillia glyphostoma
 †Syntomodrillia newmani
 †Syntomodrillia scissurata
 †Syntomodrillia spica
 †Syntomodrillia tecla
 Syrnola
 †Syzygophyllia
 †Syzygophyllia dentata
 †Syzygophyllia tampae – type locality for species

T

 Tachybaptus
  †Tachybaptus dominicus
 Tachycineta
 †Tachycineta speleodytes
 Tadarida
 †Tadarida brasiliensis
 †Tagassu
 †Tagassu tetragonus – or unidentified comparable form
 Tagelus
 †Tagelus divisus
 Talityphis
 †Talityphis pterinus
  Talparia
 †Talparia mariaelisabethae – type locality for species
  Tamias
 †Tamias aristus
 Tamiosoma
 †Tamiosoma advena – type locality for species
 Tantilla
 †Tantilla coronata
 †Taphophoyx – type locality for genus
 †Taphophoyx hodgei – type locality for species
  Tapirus
 †Tapirus haysii
 †Tapirus lundeliusi – type locality for species
 †Tapirus polkensis
 †Tapirus veroensis
 †Tapirus webbi – type locality for species
 Taras
 †Taras nucleiformis
 †Taxocardia
 †Taxocardia floridana
 Taxodium
  †Taxodium distichum
 †Tectariopsis – tentative report
 †Tectariopsis avonensis – type locality for species
 Tectonatica
 †Tectonatica floridana
 †Tectonatica mino – type locality for species
 †Tectonatica platabasis – type locality for species
  †Tectonatica pusilla
 †Tectonatica semen – type locality for species
 Tegula
 †Tegula calusa
 †Tegula exoleta
 †Tegula exoluta
  †Tegula fasciata
 †Tegula fasciatum
 †Tegula lindae
 Teinostoma
 †Teinostoma altum
 †Teinostoma avunculus
 †Teinostoma biscaynense
 †Teinostoma calliglyptum
 †Teinostoma caloosaense
 †Teinostoma carincallus
 †Teinostoma carinicallus
 †Teinostoma chipolanum
 †Teinostoma cocolitoris – or unidentified comparable form
 †Teinostoma goniogyrus
 †Teinostoma harveyensis
 †Teinostoma mekon – type locality for species
 †Teinostoma milium
 †Teinostoma nana
 †Teinostoma parvicallum
 †Teinostoma phacoton – type locality for species
 †Teinostoma tectispira
 †Teinostoma umbilicatum
 †Teinostoma washingtonensis
   †Teleoceras
 †Teleoceras hicksi
 †Teleoceras proterum
 Telescopium
 †Telescopium blackwaterensis
 †Telescopium hernandoensis
 Tellidora
 †Tellidora cristata
 †Tellidora lunulata
  Tellina
 †Tellina acalypta
 †Tellina acalyptya
 †Tellina acloneta
 †Tellina acosmita
 †Tellina agria
 †Tellina atossa
 †Tellina calligypta
 †Tellina chipolana
 †Tellina cloneta
 †Tellina ctenota – type locality for species
 †Tellina dinomera – or unidentified comparable form
 †Tellina dira
 †Tellina dodona
 †Tellina georgiana
 †Tellina hypolispa
 †Tellina lampra
 †Tellina leptalea – type locality for species
 †Tellina lintea
 †Tellina macilenta
 †Tellina merula
 †Tellina mexicana
 †Tellina piesa – type locality for species
 †Tellina segregata
 †Tellina silicata
 †Tellina similis
 †Tellina strophia
 †Tellina subaritica
 †Tellina suberis
 †Tellina sybaritica
 †Tellina waltonensis – type locality for species
 †Temblornia
 †Temblornia virgata – type locality for species
  Tenagodus
 †Tenagodus tampensis
 †Tenuicerithium
 †Tenuicerithium absonum – type locality for species
 †Tenuicerithium ascensum – type locality for species
 †Tenuicerithium permutabile
 †Tephrocyon
 †Tephrocyon scitulus
   †Teratornis
 †Teratornis merriami
 Terebellum
 †Terebellum hernandoenis – tentative report
 †Terebellum hernandoensis
  Terebra
 †Terebra aclinica
 †Terebra aulakoessa – type locality for species
 †Terebra ballista
 †Terebra binodosa
 †Terebra bipartita
  †Terebra dislocata
 †Terebra divisura
 †Terebra hunterae
 †Terebra odopoia – type locality for species
 †Terebra protexta
 †Terebra sulcifera
 †Terebra unilineata
 †Terebraspira
 †Terebraspira calusa
 †Terebraspira cronleyensis
 †Terebraspira diegelae
 †Terebraspira kissimmeensis
 †Terebraspira labellensis
 †Terebraspira lindae
 †Terebraspira maryae
 †Terebraspira okeechobeensis
 †Terebraspira osceolari
 †Terebraspira scalarina
 †Terebraspira seminole
 †Terebraspira sparrowi
 Terebratalia
 †Terebratalia dentilabris
 Terebratulina
 †Terebratulina lachryma
 Teredo
  Terrapene
  †Terrapene carolina
 Tesseracme
 †Tesseracme caloosaense
 †Tesseracme prisma
 Testudo
 Tetraplaria
 †Tetraplaria petila – type locality for species
 †Tetraplaria tuberculata
 †Texomys
  Textularia
 †Textularia articulata
 †Textularia candeiana
 †Textularia mayori
 Thalamoporella
 Thalassia
 †Thalassia syringodium
  †Thalassia testudinum
 †Thalassites – type locality for genus
 †Thalassites parkavonensis – type locality for species
  Thalassodendron
 †Thalassodendron auriculaleporis – type locality for species
 Thamnophis
  †Thamnophis sirtalis
 †Thelecythara
 †Thelecythara floridana
 Thericium
 †Thericium burnsii – type locality for species
 †Thericium callisoma
 †Thericium chipolanum
 †Thericium coccodes
 †Thericium litharium
 †Thericium peratratum
 †Thericium peregrinum
 †Thericium trilicum
 †Thericium triticum
 †Thericium vokesorum – type locality for species
 †Thericium willcoxi
 †Theriodictis
 †Theriodictis floridanus – tentative report
  †Thinobadistes
 †Thinobadistes segnis – type locality for species
 †Thinobadistes wetzeli – type locality for species
 †Thomasococcyx – type locality for genus
 †Thomasococcyx philohippus – type locality for species
  Thomomys
 †Thomomys orientalis
 Thracia
 †Thracia semirugosa
 †Thracia tristana – tentative report
 †Thracia vicksburgiana
 Thyasira
 †Thyasira trisinuata
 †Thysanus
 †Thysanus corbicula – type locality for species
 †Thysanus excentricus
  †Ticholeptus
 †Ticholeptus zygomaticus – or unidentified comparable form
 Timoclea
 †Timoclea grus
   †Titanis – type locality for genus
 †Titanis walleri – type locality for species
 Tocobaga
 †Tocobaga americanus
 Tonna
 †Tonna galea
 Torcula
 †Torcula acropora
 †Torcula alumensis
 †Torcula apicalis
 †Torcula apicaulis
 †Torcula caseyi
 †Torcula chipolana
 †Torcula jacula – type locality for species
 †Torcula jaculus
 †Torcula martinensis
 †Torcula mediosulcata
 †Torcula mississippiensis
 †Torcula mixta
 †Torcula subvariabilis
 †Torcula variabilis
 †Torcula wagneriana
 †Torcula waltonensis – type locality for species
 Totanus
 †Totanus melanoleucas
 †Totlandophis
 †Totlandophis americanus – type locality for species
 Toxostoma
  †Toxostoma rufum
 Trachemys
 †Trachemys inflata
 †Trachemys nuchocarinata
 †Trachemys platymarginata
  †Trachemys scripta
 Trachycardium
 †Trachycardium anclotense
 †Trachycardium brooksvillense
 †Trachycardium cestum
 †Trachycardium declive
 †Trachycardium delphicum
  †Trachycardium egmontianum
 †Trachycardium emmonsi
 †Trachycardium evergladensis
 †Trachycardium floridanum
 †Trachycardium hernandoense – tentative report
 †Trachycardium inconspicuum
  †Trachycardium isocardia
 †Trachycardium leonense
 †Trachycardium malacum
 †Trachycardium mollyni – type locality for species
 †Trachycardium muricatum
 †Trachycardium oedalium
 †Trachycardium plectopleura – type locality for species
 †Trachycardium silicatum
 †Trachycardium striatum
 †Trachycardium ustri
 †Trachycardium ustrix – type locality for species
 †Trachycardium virile
  Trachyphyllia
 †Trachyphyllia bilobata
 †Trachyphyllia dubia
 †Trachyphyllia walli
 Trachypollia
 †Trachypollia trachea
 Trajana
 †Trajana pyta
 †Trajana veracruzana
 Transennella
 †Transennella caloosana
 †Transennella carolinae
 †Transennella carolinensis
 †Transennella caryera
 †Transennella chipolana
 †Transennella conradiana
 †Transennella conradina
 †Transennella cubaniana
 †Transennella dasa – type locality for species
 †Transennella santarosana
 †Transennella stimpsoni
 †Transennella utica
  Tremarctos
 †Tremarctos floridanus
 †Trichechodon
 †Trichechodon huxleyi
 Trichechus
  †Trichechus manatus
  Tricolia
 †Tricolia affinis
 †Tricolia precursor
 †Tricolia probrevis – type locality for species
 †Tricolia umbilicata
 †Trigonictis
 †Trigonictis cookii
 †Trigonictis macrodon
 Trigoniocardia
 †Trigoniocardia aliculum
 †Trigoniocardia berberum
 †Trigoniocardia columba
 †Trigoniocardia deadenense
 †Trigoniocardia gadsdenense
 †Trigoniocardia protoalicum
 †Trigoniocardia simrothi
 †Trigoniocardia willcoxi
 †Trigoniostoma
 †Trigoniostoma sericea
 Trigonopora
 †Trigonopora vicksburgica
  Trigonostoma
 †Trigonostoma carolinense
 †Trigonostoma drudi
 †Trigonostoma druidi
 †Trigonostoma hoelei
 †Trigonostoma hoerlei
 †Trigonostoma marthae
 †Trigonostoma perspectiva
 †Trigonostoma sericea
 †Trigonostoma smithfieldensis
 †Trigonostoma sphenoidostoma – type locality for species
 †Trigonostoma subthomasiae
 †Trigonostoma tampaensis
 †Trigonostoma tenerum
 †Trigonostoma teriera
 Trigonulina
 †Trigonulina dalli – type locality for species
 †Trigonulina emmonsii
 †Trigonulina ornata
 Triloculina
 †Triloculina linneiana
 †Trinacria
 †Trinacria meekii
 Tringa
 †Tringa flaviceps
  †Tringa melanoleuca
  †Tringa solitaria
 Triphora
 †Triphora bartschi
 †Triphora hemphilli
  Triplofusus
 †Triplofusus acmaensis
 †Triplofusus duplinensis
 †Triplofusus giganteus
 †Triplofusus kindlei
 Tritonoharpa
 †Tritonoharpa lanceolata
 Trivia
 †Trivia capillata – type locality for species
 †Trivia chipolana – type locality for species
 †Trivia clypeus
 †Trivia islahispaniolae
 †Trivia juliae – type locality for species
 †Trivia vaughani – type locality for species
 Trochita
 †Trochita aperta
 †Trochita costaria
 †Trochita crenata – type locality for species
 †Trochita floridana
 †Trochita ornata
 Troglodytes
  †Troglodytes aedon
 Trona
 †Trona leporina
  Trophon
 †Trophon lepidota
  †Tropidophis – or unidentified comparable form
 †Tropochasca
 †Tropochasca lindae
 †Tropochasca metae
 †Tropochasca petiti
 †Trossulasalpinx
 †Trossulasalpinx curtus
 †Trossulasalpinx kissimmeenesis
 †Trossulasalpinx lindae
 †Trossulasalpinx maryae
 †Trossulasalpinx trossulus
 †Trossulasalpinx vokesae
 Trypostega
 †Trypostega inornata
 †Tubucella
 †Tubucella gibbosa
  Tucetona
 †Tucetona arata
 †Tucetona lamyi
 †Tucetona pectinata
  Turbinella
 †Turbinella chipolanus
 †Turbinella dodonaius – type locality for species
 †Turbinella hoerlei
 †Turbinella lindar
 †Turbinella polygonatus
 †Turbinella scolymoides
 †Turbinella streami
 †Turbinella suwanneensis
 †Turbinella wendyae
 †Turbinella wheeleri
 Turbo
 †Turbo castaenus
  †Turbo castanea
 †Turbo crenorugatus
 †Turbo duerri
 †Turbo floridensis
 †Turbo lindae
 †Turbo rhectogrammicus
 †Turbo wellsi
 Turbonilla
  †Turbonilla hemphilli
 †Turbonilla levis – or unidentified comparable form
 Turdus
  Turritella
 †Turritella alcida
 †Turritella alumensis
 †Turritella apicalis
 †Turritella atacta
 †Turritella bifastigata – or unidentified related form
 †Turritella bowenae
 †Turritella buckinghamensis
 †Turritella cookei
 †Turritella dalli – type locality for species
 †Turritella etiwanensis
 †Turritella fischeri – type locality for species
 †Turritella floridana
 †Turritella gatunensis
 †Turritella gladeensis
 †Turritella halensis – or unidentified comparable form
 †Turritella holmesi
 †Turritella litharia
 †Turritella magnasulcus
 †Turritella maiquetiana
 †Turritella mansfieldi
 †Turritella martinensis
 †Turritella megalobasis
 †Turritella pagodaeformis
 †Turritella perattenuata
 †Turritella pontoni
 †Turritella segmenta – type locality for species
 †Turritella subannulata
 †Turritella subanulata
 †Turritella subgrundifera
 †Turritella tampae
 †Turritella tarponensis
 †Turritella vicksburgensis
 †Turritella wagneriana
 †Turritella waltonensis
  Tursiops – or unidentified comparable form
  Tutufa
 †Tutufa pelouatensis
 Tympanuchus
  †Tympanuchus cupido
 Typhina
 †Typhina alata
 †Typhina mississippiensis
 †Typhina obesa
 Typhinellus
 †Typhinellus chipolanus – type locality for species
 †Typhinellus floridonus
 Typhis
 †Typhis floridanus – type locality for species
 †Typhis harrisi – type locality for species
 †Typhis keenae – type locality for species
  Typhlops – tentative report
 Tyrannus
 †Tyrannus tyrannus
 Tyronia
 †Tyronia aequiscostata
 †Tyrpostega
 †Tyrpostega inornata
 Tyto
 †Tyto alba
 †Tyto pratincola

U

  Ulmus
 †Ulmus prestonia – type locality for species
 Umbonula
 †Umbonula radiata
 †Urocoptis
 †Urocoptis floridana
 Urocyon
  †Urocyon cinereoargenteus
 †Urocyon citrinus – type locality for species
 †Urocyon minicephalus – type locality for species
 †Urocyon webbi – type locality for species
 Uromitra
 †Uromitra amblipleura – type locality for species
 †Uromitra barnardense
 †Uromitra berkeyi
 †Uromitra climacoton – type locality for species
 †Uromitra climax – type locality for species
 †Uromitra cnestum – type locality for species
 †Uromitra ctenotum – type locality for species
 †Uromitra gunteri
 †Uromitra hamadryados
 †Uromitra hamadryas – type locality for species
 †Uromitra healeyi
 †Uromitra holmesii
 †Uromitra mangilopse – type locality for species
 †Uromitra mikkulum – type locality for species
 †Uromitra myrum
 †Uromitra scopuli
 †Uromitra syrum
 †Uromitra triptum – type locality for species
 †Uromitra willcoxi
 Urosalpinx
  †Urosalpinx cinerea
 †Urosalpinx hillsboroensis
 †Urosalpinx inornata
 †Urosalpinx perrugata
 †Urosalpinx phrikna
 †Urosalpinx rucksorum
 †Urosalpinx subsidus
 †Urosalpinx suffolkensis
 †Urosalpinx tribaka – type locality for species
 †Urosalpinx trossulus
 †Urosalpinx violetae
 †Urosalpinx xustris – type locality for species
 †Urosalpinx zulloi
 Ursus
  †Ursus americanus
 Uvigerina
 †Uvigerina auberiana
 †Uvigerina perigrina

V

 †Vaginella
 †Vaginella chipolana
 Valvulineria
 †Valvulineria floridana
 Vasum
 †Vasum barkleyae
 †Vasum chilesi
 †Vasum elongatum – type locality for species
 †Vasum floridanum
 †Vasum griffini
 †Vasum haitensis
 †Vasum hertweckorum
  †Vasum horridum
 †Vasum hyshugari
 †Vasum jacksonae
 †Vasum jacksonense
 †Vasum kissimmense
 †Vasum lindae
 †Vasum locklini
 †Vasum martinshugari
  †Vasum muricatum
 †Vasum olssoni
 †Vasum palmerae
 †Vasum shinerae
 †Vasum shrinerae
 †Vasum squamosum
 †Vasum subcapitellum
 †Vasum suwanneensis
 †Vasum tribulosum – type locality for species
 †Vasum violetae
 †Vasum vokesae
 †Vasum vokesi
  †Velates
 †Velates perversus
 Venericardia
 †Venericardia hesperide
 †Venericardia nodifera
 †Venericardia olga
 †Venericardia vicksburgiana
 †Venericardia withlacoochensis – type locality for species
 Ventricolaria
 †Ventricolaria blandiana – or unidentified comparable form
 Ventrilia
 †Ventrilia alumensis
 †Ventrilia carolinensis
 †Ventrilia rucksorum
 †Ventrilia senarium
 †Ventrilia smithfieldensis
 †Ventrilia tenerum
 Venus
 †Venus halidona
 †Venus marionensis
 Vermicularia
 †Vermicularia fargoi
 †Vermicularia nigricana
 †Vermicularia recta
 †Vermicularia spirata
 †Vermicularia weberi
 †Vermicularia woodringi
 Vermivora
  †Vermivora celata – or unidentified comparable form
 Vertebralina
 †Vertebralina cassis
 Verticordia
 †Verticordia dalli
 Vertigo
  †Vertigo milium
 †Vertigo ovata
 Vexillum
 †Vexillum ctenotum
 †Vexillum triptum
 †Vexillum wandoense
 †Viburnum
  †Viburnum dentatum – or unidentified comparable form
 †Viburnum nudum
 †Vireo
  †Vireo griseus
 †Virgulina
 †Virgulina fusiformis – or unidentified comparable form
 †Virgulina miocenica
 †Virgulina pontoni
 Vitis
  †Vitis rotundifolia – or unidentified comparable form
 †Vitricythara
 †Vitricythara metrica
 †Vitricythara micromeris
 Vitrinella
 †Vitrinella excavata – type locality for species
 †Vitrinella floridana
 †Vitrinella seminola – type locality for species
 †Vitrinella waltonia – type locality for species
 Vitularia
 †Vitularia liguabson
 Viviparus
  †Viviparus georgianus
 Vokesimurex
 †Vokesimurex anniae
 †Vokesimurex bellegladeensis
 †Vokesimurex bermontianus
 †Vokesimurex diegelae
  †Vokesimurex rubidus
 †Vokesinotus
 †Vokesinotus lepidotus
 †Vokesinotus perrugatus
 Volsella
 †Voluticella – type locality for genus
 †Voluticella levensis – type locality for species
 Volutifusus
 †Volutifusus emmonsi
 †Volutifusus halscotti
 †Volutifusus mutabilis
 †Volutifusus obtusa
 †Volutifusus obtusus
 †Volutifusus spengleri
 Volvarina
 †Volvarina acusvesta
 †Volvarina albolineata
 †Volvarina avena
 †Volvarina belloides
 †Volvarina eobella – type locality for species
 †Volvarina oryzoides – type locality for species
 Volvula
 †Volvula phoinicoides – type locality for species
 Volvulella
 †Volvulella oxytata
 †Volvulella persimilis
 †Volvulella phoinicoides
 †Volvulella tritica
 Vulpes
 †Vulpes stenognathus
  Vulpes vulpes – type locality for species

W

 †Weisbordella
 †Weisbordella cubae
 †Weisbordella johnsoni
 †Wythella
 †Wythella eldridgei

X

 Xancus
 †Xancus regina
 †Xanthium
 †Xenochelys
 †Xenochelys floridensis – type locality for species
 Xenophora
  †Xenophora conchyliophora
 †Xenophora conchyliphora
 †Xenophora delecta
 †Xenophora textilina
  †Xenosmilus – type locality for genus
 †Xenosmilus hodsonae – type locality for species

Y

 Yoldia
 †Yoldia frater
 †Yoldia kurzi
 †Yoldia soror – type locality for species
 †Yoldia waltonensis
 †Yumaceras
 †Yumaceras hamiltoni

Z

  Zapus
 Zebina
 †Zebina browniana
 †Zebina johnsoni
 †Zebina laevigata
 †Zebina tersa
 †Zebina vittata – type locality for species
 Zenaida
  †Zenaida macroura
 †Zenaida rnacroura
 †Zenaidura
 †Zenaidura macroura
 Zizyphus
 †Zodiolestes
 †Zodiolestes freundi – type locality for species
 Zonaria
 †Zonaria heilprinii – type locality for species
 †Zonaria praelatior – type locality for species
 †Zonaria shirleyae – type locality for species
 †Zonaria spurcoides
 †Zonaria theresae – type locality for species
 †Zonaria tumulus
 Zonitoides
 †Zonitoides arboreus
 Zonotrichia
 †Zonotrichia albicollis – or unidentified comparable form
  †Zonotrichia leucophrys – or unidentified comparable form
 Zonulispira
 †Zonulispira crocata

References

 

Cenozoic
Florida